= Sepp publishing family =

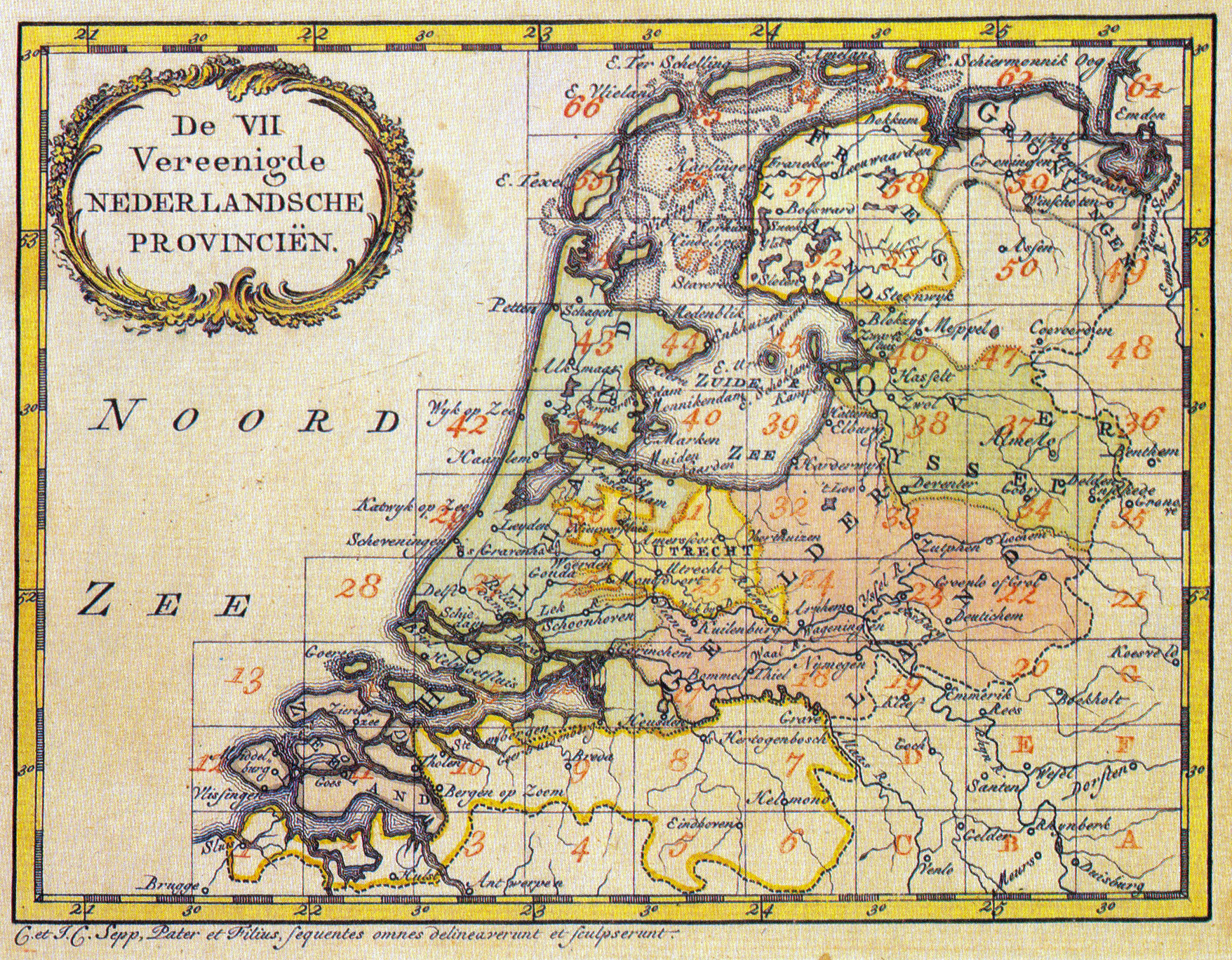
A map drawn by J.C. Sepp (1793)

Four generations of the Sepp family, publishers and artists were naturalists or entomologists. The Sepp company became famous for the numerous large natural history collections of plates that appeared between 1768 and 1860. They published translations from English, French and German authors on natural history, prints by Petrus Camper, an anatomist, but also some religious songs. Pieter Cramer and Caspar Stoll, also entomologists, had their works published by Sepp.

== Genealogy ==
=== Christiaan Andreas Sepp ===
In the first generation was Christiaan Andreas Sepp (c. 1710-2 August 1775), born in Goslar, the son of a conrector, who established himself shortly in Hamburg and Göttingen, but before 1739 in Amsterdam as an etcher and engraver of land and sea maps. His son, Jan Christiaan, was baptized in 1739 in the Lutheran church, like Johanna Elisabeth in 1744. In 1750 Christiaan bought a house at Rozengracht, in the Jordaan. Sepp was working from his own collection of preserved butterflies and insects wrote and illustrated Nederlandsche Insecten (in English: Dutch Insects), which appeared from 1762 to 1860, the company's first long-term project. There are similarities with the work of August Johann Rösel von Rosenhof and René Antoine Ferchault de Réaumur.

=== Jan Christiaan Sepp ===
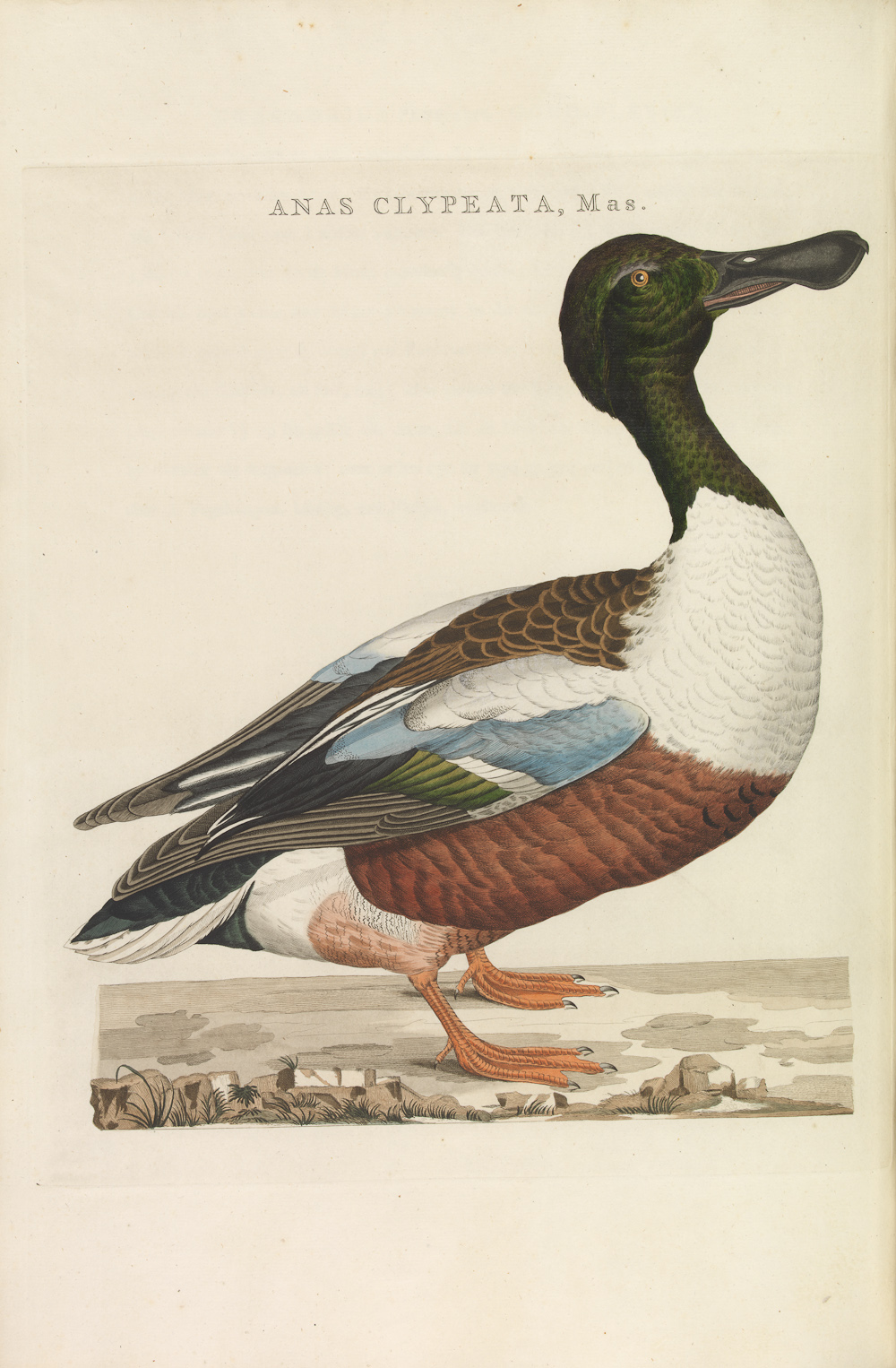
Image from Nederlandsche Vogelen by Nozeman and Sepp

His son, Jan Christiaan Sepp (November 11, 1739 – November 29, 1811), joined his father's business. He married in 1768 the 14-year older S. Focking, the daughter of a Dantzig paperseller. After she died in 1773 he remarried. He moved to a house at Haarlemmerstraat, which probably also served as a bookshop. All his children (11) were baptized in the Mennonite church. In 1777 he was one of the founders of Felix Meritis, a "club" where artists and scientist gathered or discussed, with an eminent building on Keizersgracht. Five years later he was a Mennonite teacher on Singel.

Jan Christiaan was an engraver, etcher, bookseller, author as well as illustrator for Nederlandsche Vogelen (in English: Dutch Birds). The price for the complete set of books was 525 Dutch guilders. It must have held the record for being the most expensive book published in the Netherlands for a very long time.

=== Jan Sepp ===
Sepp brought his son Jan (September 18, 1778 – December 19, 1853) into the business, which then traded as J.C. Sepp en Zoon. After the death of Jan, the work continued to be published by Cornelis Sepp until 1868.

== Publications ==
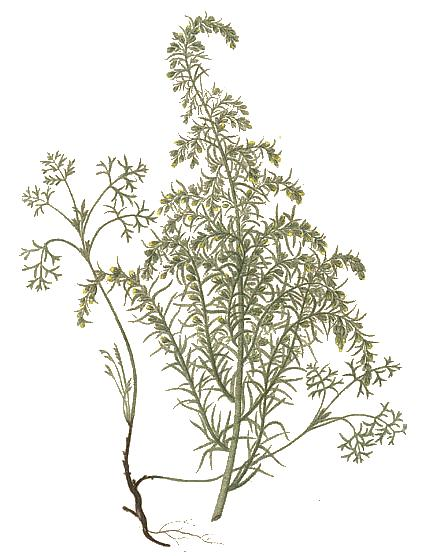
A picture drawn by J.C. Sepp, (1832)

- Houtkunde, behelzende de afbeeldingen van meest alle bekende, in- en uitlandsche houten : die tot den huis- en scheepsbouw, tot schrynwerk, werktuigen en gereedschappen, tot verwstoffen en in de geneeskunde, worden gebruikt; op zulk eene manier, als die door de liefhebbers der natuurlyke historie, tot vermaak en nutttigheid, worden verzameld en bewaard; met aanwyzing van derzelver afkomst, hoedanigheden en gebruik; voorgesteld in de natuuriyke tekening en koleuren, volgens de hollandsche, hoogduitsche, engelsche, fransche en latynsche benaamingen en met uitvoerige bladwyzers verrykt. 1791 (Literally: Wood science, including the illustrations of most well-known, native and foreign timber: used for home and ship building, for carpentry, tools and tools, for fabrication and in medicine; in such a way as they are collected and preserved by lovers of natural history, for entertainment and usefulness; with indication of its origin, qualities and uses; presented in the natural drawing and colors, according to the Dutch, German, English, French and Latin names and with extensive bookmarks. 1791)
- Nieuwe kaart van de eilanden van Groot Brittannien : behelzende de koningryken Engeland, Schotland en Ierland / volgens de laatste waarnemingen in het ligt gebragt; C Sepp del. et sculps. 1743 (Literally: New map of the islands of Great Britain: including the kings of England, Scotland and Ireland / according to the latest observations it lies in; C Sepp del. et sculps. 1743)
- Naauwkeurige kaart der Vereenigde Nederlanden tot opheldering der vaderlandsche historie in de zestiende eeuwe / C. Sepp delin[eavit] et fec[it] (Literally: Accurate map of the United Netherlands to clarify the national history in the sixteenth century / C. Sepp delin [eavit] et fec [it])
- Verzameling van uitlandsche en zeldzaame vogelen : benevens eenige vreemde dieren en plantgewassen, in 't engelsch naauwkeurig beschreeven en naar 't leven met kleuren afgebeeld / door G. Edwards en M. Catesby.; vervolgens, ten opzigt van de plaaten merkelyk verbeterd, in 't hoogduitsch uitgegeven door J.M. Seligmann; thans in 't nederduitsch vertaald en met aanhaalingen van andere autheuren verrykt, door Martinus Houttuyn (Literally: Collection of foreign and rare birds: in addition to some strange animals and plant crops, accurately described in English and depicted in life with colors / by G. Edwards and M. Catesby .; subsequently, markedly improved with regard to the plates, published in German by J.M. Seligmann; now translated into Dutch and entangled with quotes from other car rents, by Martinus Houttuyn)
- Afbeelding der marmor soorten, volgend hunne natuurlyke koleuren naauwkeurig afgebeeld, ook met de bygevoegde Hollandsche, Hoogduitsche, Engelsche, Fransche en Latynsche benaamingen voorzien (Literally: Image of the marmor species, accurately depicted according to their natural colors, also with the enclosed Dutch, High German, English, French and Latin names)
- Beschouwing der wonderen Gods, in de minstgeachte schepzelen : of Nederlandsche insecten, naar hunne aanmerkelyke huishouding, verwonderlyke gedaantewisseling en andere wetenswaardige byzonderheden, volgens eigen ondervinding beschreeven, naar 't leven naauwkeurig getekend, in't koper gebracht en gekleurd - in the collection of Teylers Museum (Literally: Consideration of the miracles of God, in the least beloved creatures: whether Dutch insects, according to their notable household, surprising metamorphosis and other interesting details, described according to their own experience, drawn accurately to life, brought into copper and colored - in the collection of Teylers Museum)
- Nederlandsche vogelen volgens hunne huishouding, aert en eigenschappen beschreeven. / Door Cornelius Nozeman; alle naer 't leeven geheel opnieuw en naeukeurig getekend, in 't koper gebragt, en natuurlijk gekoleurd door, en onder opzicht van, Christiaan Sepp en zoon. Deel: 1. 1770. 2. 1789. 3. 1797. 4. 1809. 5. Aanhangsel [1829](Literally: Dutch birds according to their household, aert and properties described. / By Cornelius Nozeman; all of them live completely redesigned and meticulously drawn, borne in copper, and of course polished by and under the supervision of Christiaan Sepp and son. Part: 1. 1770. 2. 1789. 3. 1797. 4. 1809. 5. Appendix [1829])
- De VII Vereenigde Nederlandsche Provinciën / naar de nieuwste meetingen naauwkeurig geteekend en in 't koper gebragt door Christiaan Sepp en Zoon 1793. (Literally: The VII Vereenigde Nederlandsche Provinciën / accurately drawn to the newest measurements and retained in copper by Christiaan Sepp and Son 1793.)
- Nederlandsche insecten naar hunne aanmerkelijke huishouding, verwonderlijke gedaanteverwisseling, en andere wetenswaardige bijzonderheden / beschreven en afgebeeld door Jan Christiaan Sepp (Literally: Dutch insects according to their notable household, surprising transformation, and other interesting details / described and depicted by Jan Christiaan Sepp)
- Flora Batava / afgebeeld door en van wegens J.C. Sepp en Zoon; beschreven door Jan Kops (Literally: Flora Batava / pictured by and from due to J.C. Sepp and Son; described by Jan Kops)
- Nieuwe geographische Nederlandsche reise- en zak-atlas : vervattende vier en zeventig gekleurde, naauwkeurig geteekende en gegraveerde, ook accuraat aan elkander sluitende kaarten van de Vereenigde Nederlanden : ... / [Jan Christiaan Sepp] (Literally: New geographic Dutch travel and pocket atlas: containing seventy-four colored, meticulously drawn and engraved, also accurately aligned maps of the United Netherlands: ... / [Jan Christiaan Sepp])
- Surinaamsche vlinders : naar het leven geteekend = Papillons de Surinam ... / [tekst J. Sepp; tekeningen H.J. Scheller] (Literally: Surinamese butterflies: drawn to life = Papillons de Surinam ... / [text J. Sepp; drawings H.J. Scheller])

== Sources ==
- Aa, A.J. van der (1851–'57) Biografisch Woordenboek der Nederlanden. Haarlem.
- https://natuurtijdschriften.nl/pub/1012632/EB1987047010001.pdf
