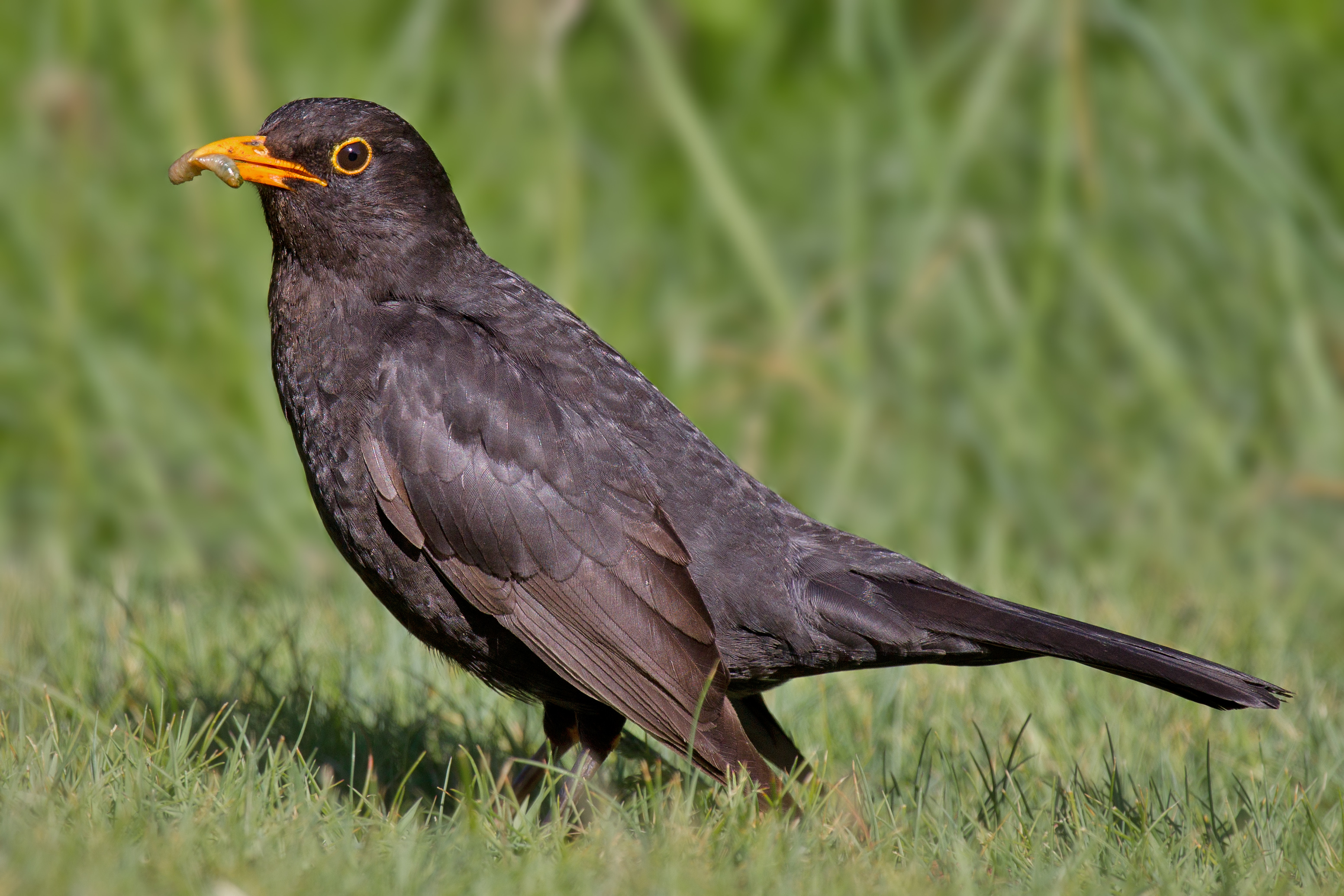
- Male T. m. merula
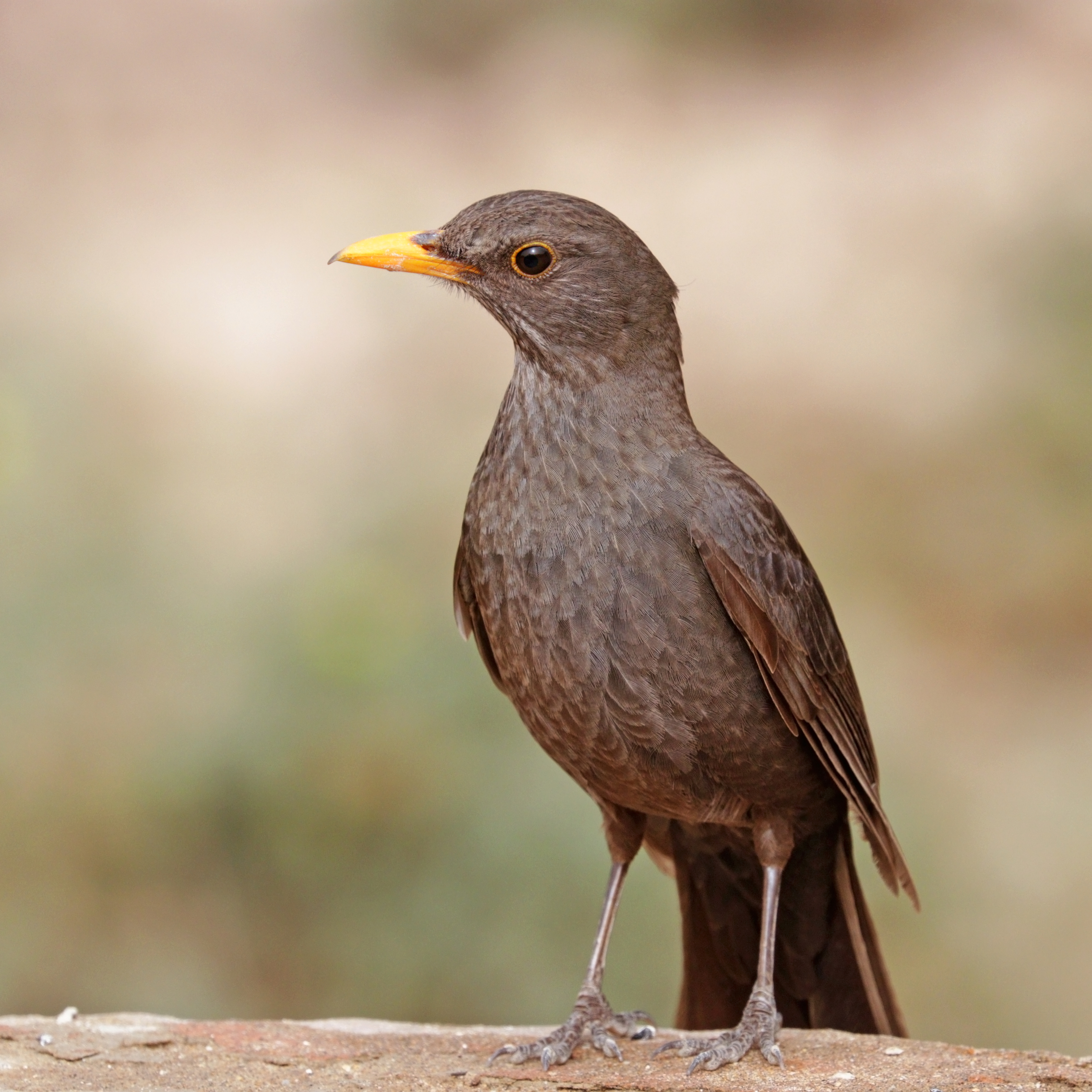
- Female T. m. mauritanicus: Common blackbird song in Bucharest, Romania

Conservation status
- Least Concern (IUCN 3.1)

Scientific classification
- Kingdom: Animalia
- Phylum: Chordata
- Class: Aves
- Order: Passeriformes
- Family: Turdidae
- Genus: Turdus
- Species: T. merula

Binomial name
- Turdus merula Linnaeus, 1758
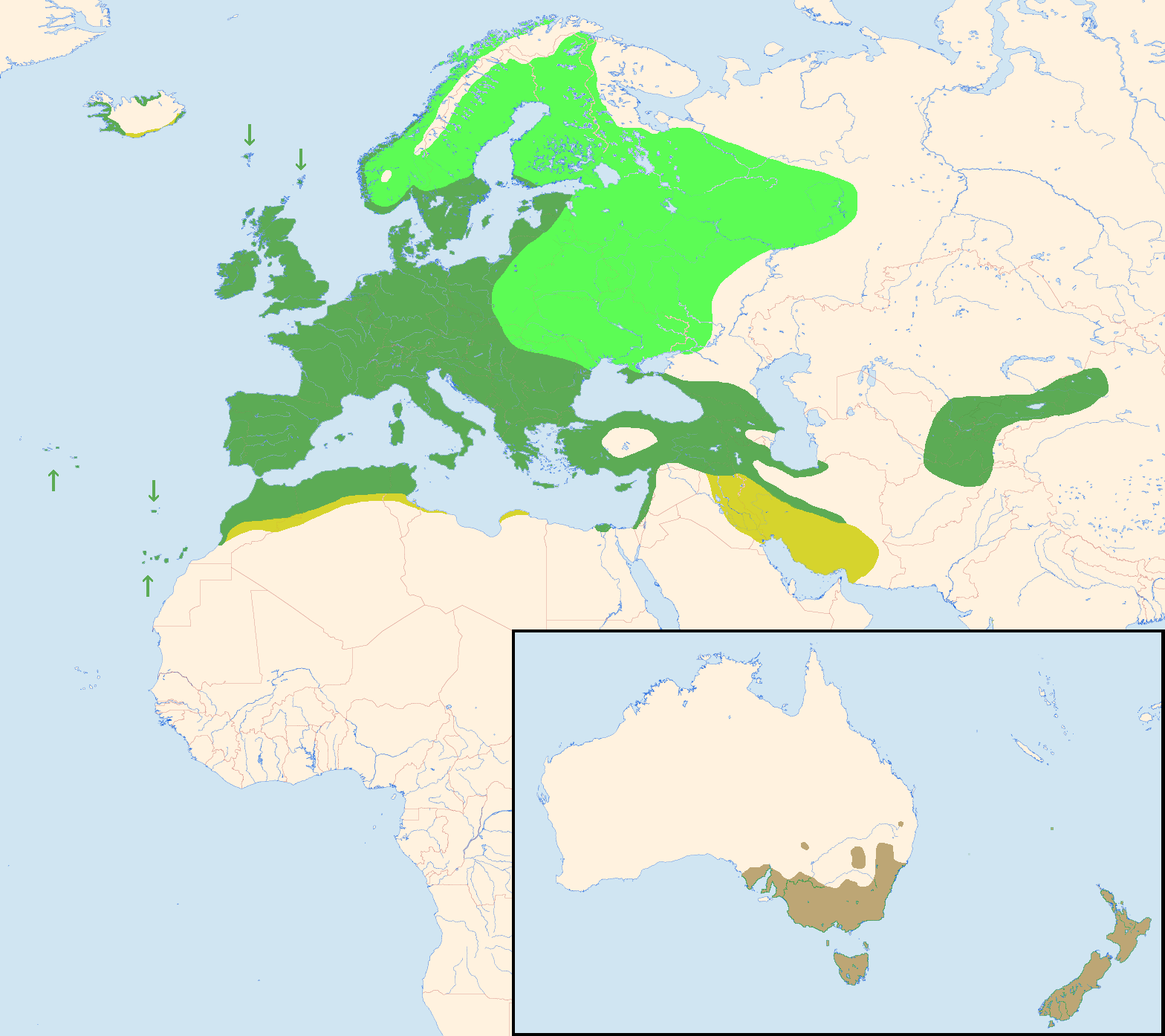
- Distribution Breeding summer visitor Breeding resident Nonbreeding winter visitor Introduced invasive populations

= Common blackbird =

Common blackbird Temporal range: Zanclean–Present (Note: Fossil remains are known from between 5.33 and 0.78 million years ago.)

Thrush native to Europe, western Asia and North Africa

The common blackbird (Turdus merula) is a species of true thrush. It is also known as the Eurasian blackbird (especially in North America, to distinguish it from the distinct New World blackbirds), or simply the blackbird. It breeds in Europe, western Asia, and North Africa, and has been introduced to Australia and New Zealand. It has a number of subspecies across its large range; a few former Asian subspecies are now widely treated as separate species. Depending on latitude, the common blackbird may be resident, partially migratory, or fully migratory.

The adult male of the common blackbird (Turdus merula merula, the nominate subspecies), which is found throughout most of Europe, is all black except for a yellow eye-ring and bill and has a rich, melodious song. The adult female and juvenile have mainly dark brown plumage. This species breeds in woods and gardens, constructing neat, cup-shaped nests bound together with mud. It is omnivorous, eating a wide range of insects, earthworms, berries, and fruits.

Both sexes are territorial on the breeding grounds and have distinctive threat displays. However, they are more gregarious during migration and in wintering areas. Pairs remain in their territory throughout the year if the climate is sufficiently temperate. This common and conspicuous species has given rise to a number of literary and cultural references, often related to its song.

== Taxonomy and systematics ==
The common blackbird was described by Carl Linnaeus in his landmark 1758 10th edition of Systema Naturae as Turdus merula (characterised as T. ater, rostro palpebrisque fulvis). The binomial name derives from two Latin words, turdus, "thrush", and merula, "blackbird", the latter giving rise to its French name, merle, and its Scots name, merl.

The genus Turdus comprises around 65 species of medium to large thrushes, characterised by rounded heads, longish, pointed wings, and usually melodious songs. Two European thrushes, the song thrush and mistle thrush, diverged early from the Eurasian lineage of Turdus thrushes after spreading north from Africa. However, the blackbird is descended from ancestors that had colonised the Canary Islands from Africa and subsequently reached Europe from there. It is close in evolutionary terms to the island thrush (T. poliocephalus) of Southeast Asia and islands in the southwest Pacific, which probably diverged from T. merula stock fairly recently.

It may not immediately be clear why the name "blackbird", first recorded in 1486, was applied to this species and not to any of the various other common black birds found in England, such as the carrion crow, raven, rook, or jackdaw. In Old English, and in modern English up to about the 18th century, the word "bird" was used only for smaller or young birds, while larger ones such as crows were known as "fowl". At that time, the blackbird was therefore the only widespread and conspicuous "black bird" in the British Isles. Until about the 17th century, another name for the species was ouzel, ousel or wosel (from Old English osle, cf. German Amsel). Another variant occurs in Act 3 of William Shakespeare's A Midsummer Night's Dream, where Bottom refers to "The Woosell cocke, so blacke of hew, With Orenge-tawny bill". The ouzel usage survived later in poetry, and still occurs as the name of the closely related ring ouzel (Turdus torquatus), and in water ouzel, an alternative name for the unrelated but superficially similar white-throated dipper (Cinclus cinclus).

Five related Asian Turdus thrushes—the white-collared blackbird (T. albocinctus), the grey-winged blackbird (T. boulboul), the Indian blackbird (T. simillimus), the Tibetan blackbird (T. maximus), and the Chinese blackbird (T. mandarinus)—are also named blackbirds; the latter three species were formerly treated as conspecific with the common blackbird. In addition, the Somali thrush (T. (olivaceus) ludoviciae) is alternatively known as the Somali blackbird.

The icterid family of the New World is sometimes called the blackbird family because some species superficially resemble to the common blackbird and other Old World thrushes. However, they are not evolutionarily close; they are actually related to the New World warblers and tanagers. The term is often limited to smaller species with mostly or entirely black plumage, at least in the breeding male, notably the cowbirds, the grackles, and for around 20 species with "blackbird" in the name, such as the red-winged blackbird and the melodious blackbird.

=== Subspecies ===
As expected for a widespread passerine bird species, several geographical subspecies are recognised. The treatment of subspecies in this article follows Clement et al. (2000).

- T. m. merula, the nominate subspecies, breeds commonly throughout much of Europe from Iceland, the Faroes and the British Isles east to the Ural Mountains and north to about 70 N, where it is fairly scarce. A small population breeds in the Nile Valley. Birds from the north of the range winter throughout Europe and around the Mediterranean, including Cyprus and North Africa. The introduced birds in Australia and New Zealand are of the nominate race.
- T. m. azorensis is a small race which breeds in the Azores. The male is darker and glossier than merula.
- T. m. cabrerae, named for Ángel Cabrera, the Spanish zoologist, resembles azorensis and breeds in Madeira and the western Canary Islands.
- T. m. mauritanicus, another small dark subspecies with a glossy black male plumage, breeds in central and northern Morocco, coastal Algeria and northern Tunisia.
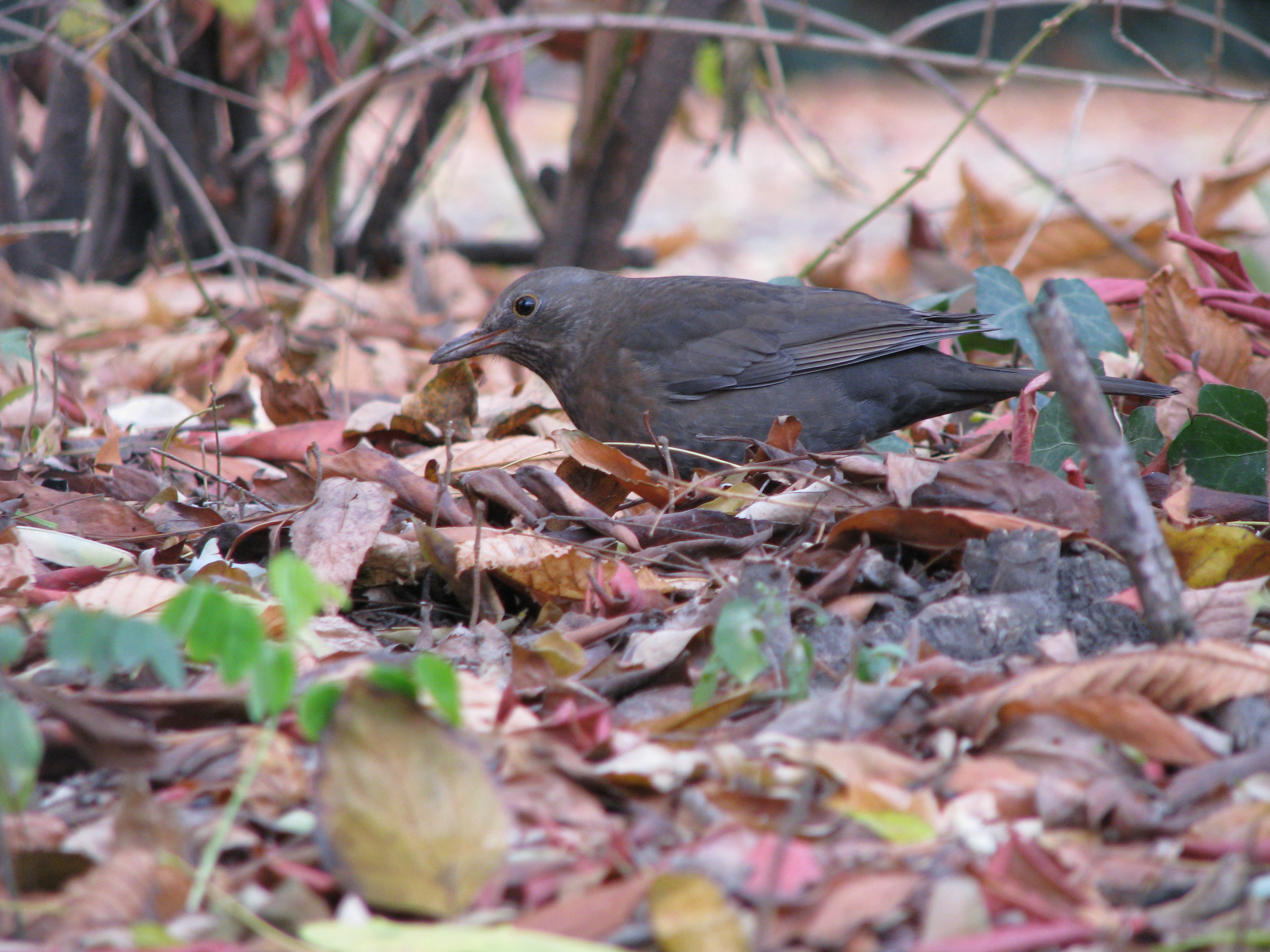
  First-summer male, probably subspecies aterrimus
- T m. aterrimus breeds in Hungary, south and east to southern Greece, Crete, northern Turkey and northern Iran. It winters in southern Turkey, northern Egypt, Iraq and southern Iran. It is smaller than merula with a duller male and paler female plumage.
- T. m. syriacus breeds on the Mediterranean coast of southern Turkey south to Jordan, Israel and the northern Sinai. It is mostly resident, but part of the population moves southwest or west to winter in the Jordan Valley and in the Nile Delta of northern Egypt south to about Cairo. Both sexes of this subspecies are darker and greyer than the equivalent merula plumages.
- T. m. intermedius is an Asian race breeding from Central Russia to Tajikistan, western and northeastern Afghanistan, and eastern China. Many birds are resident, but some are altitudinal migrants and occur in southern Afghanistan and southern Iraq in winter. This is a large subspecies, with a sooty-black male and a blackish-brown female.

The Central Asian subspecies, the relatively large intermedius, also differs in structure and voice, and may represent a distinct species. Alternatively, it has been suggested that it should be considered a subspecies of T. maximus, but it differs in structure, voice and the appearance of the eye-ring.

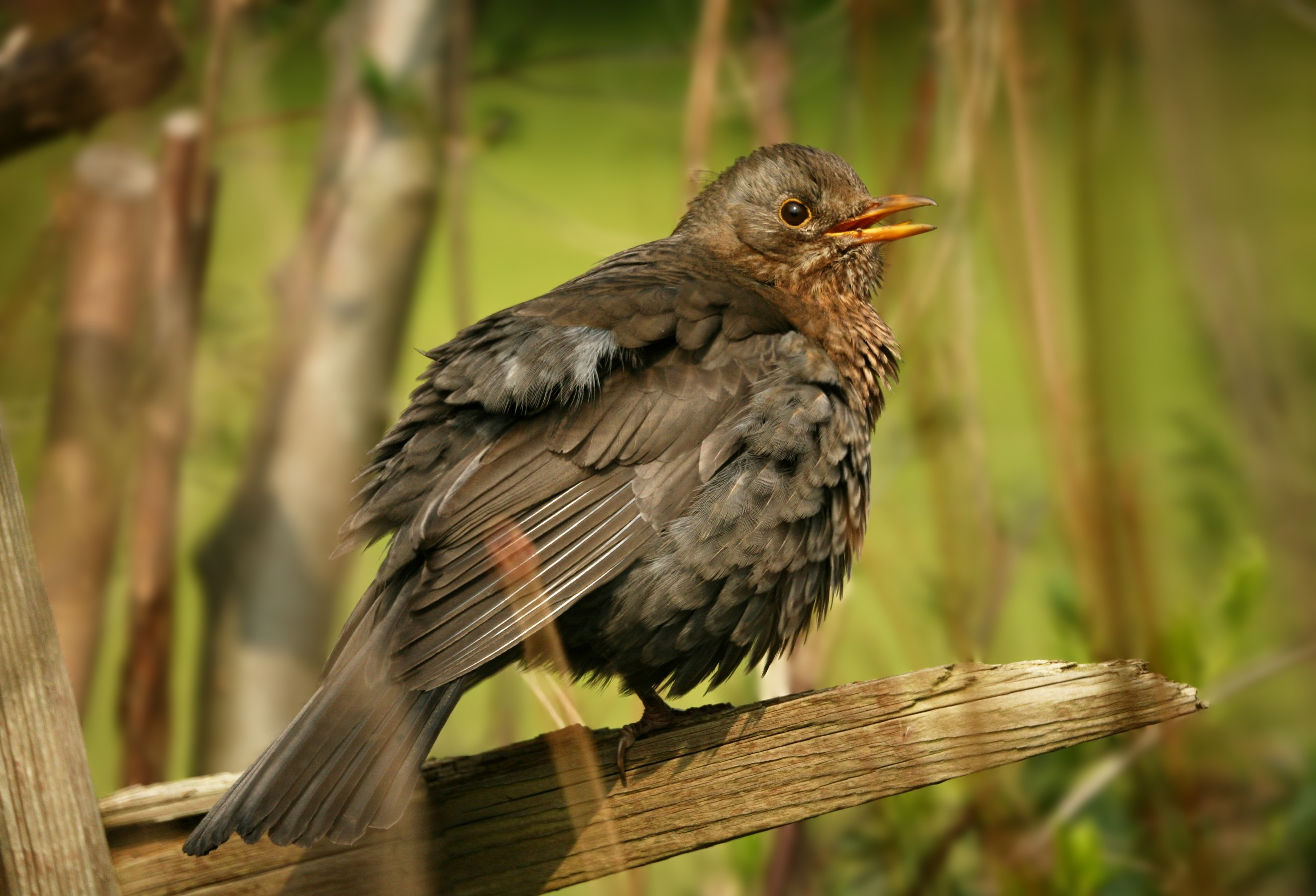
Female of subspecies merula

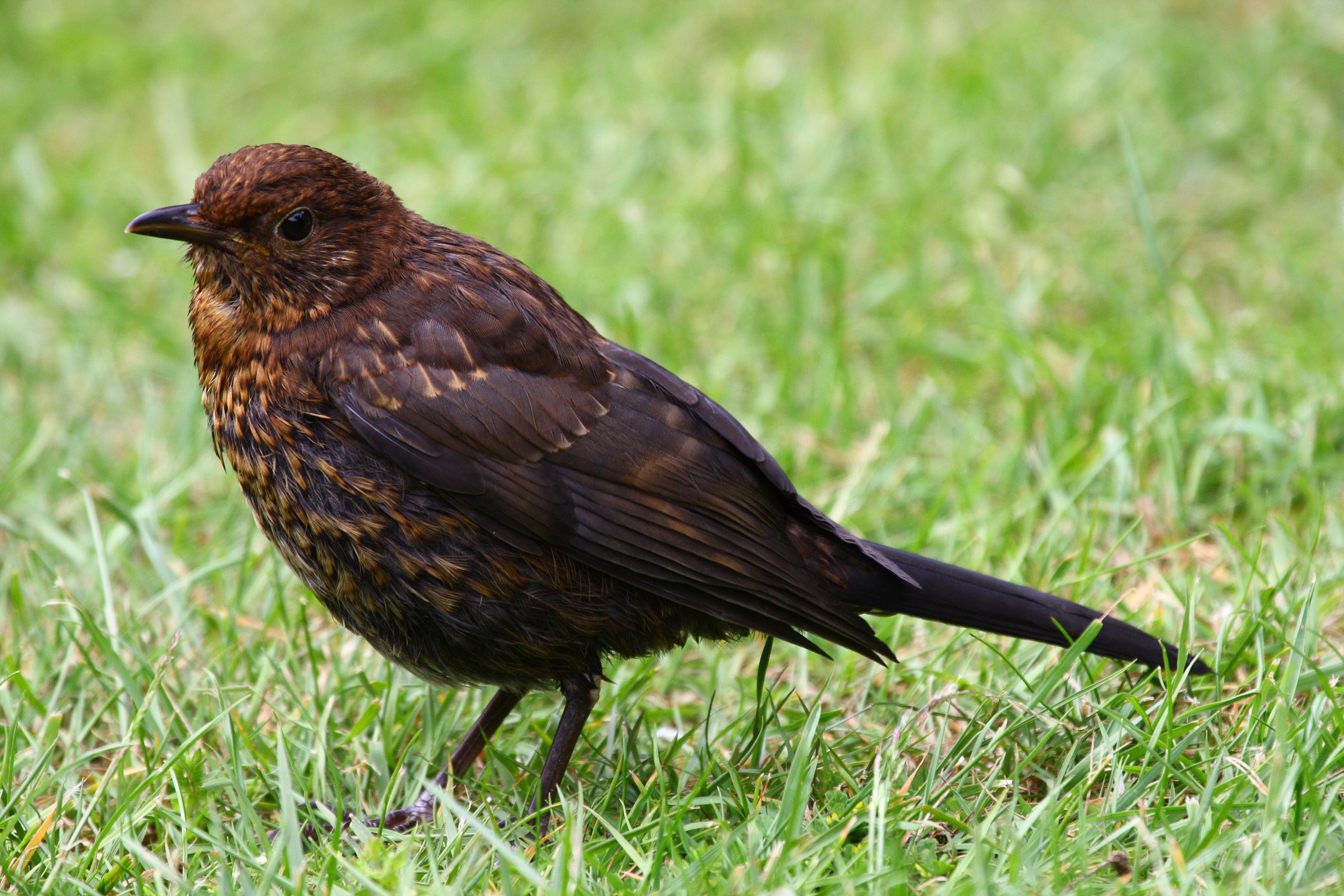
Juvenile T. m. merula in England

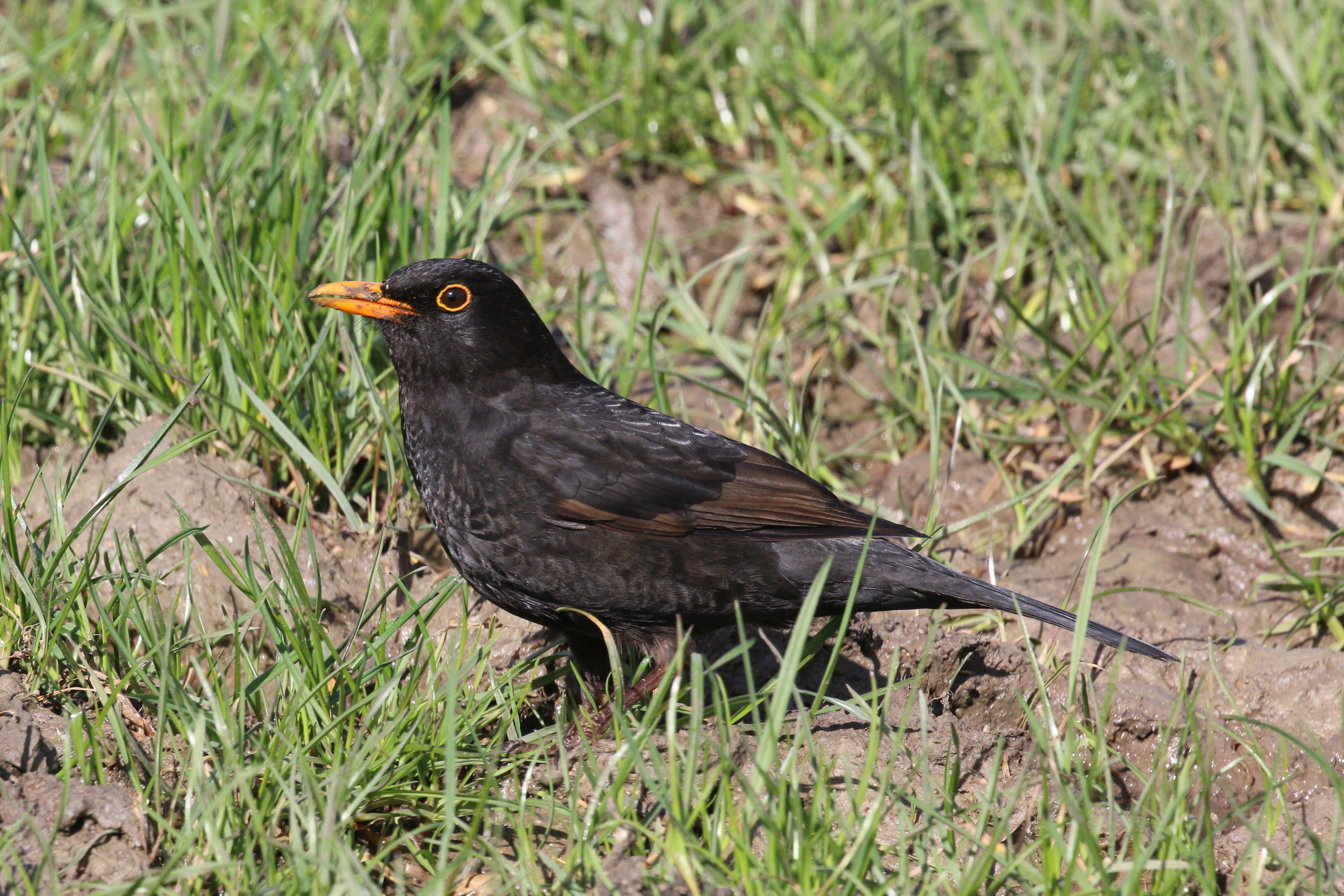
Young adult T. m. merula in Oxfordshire

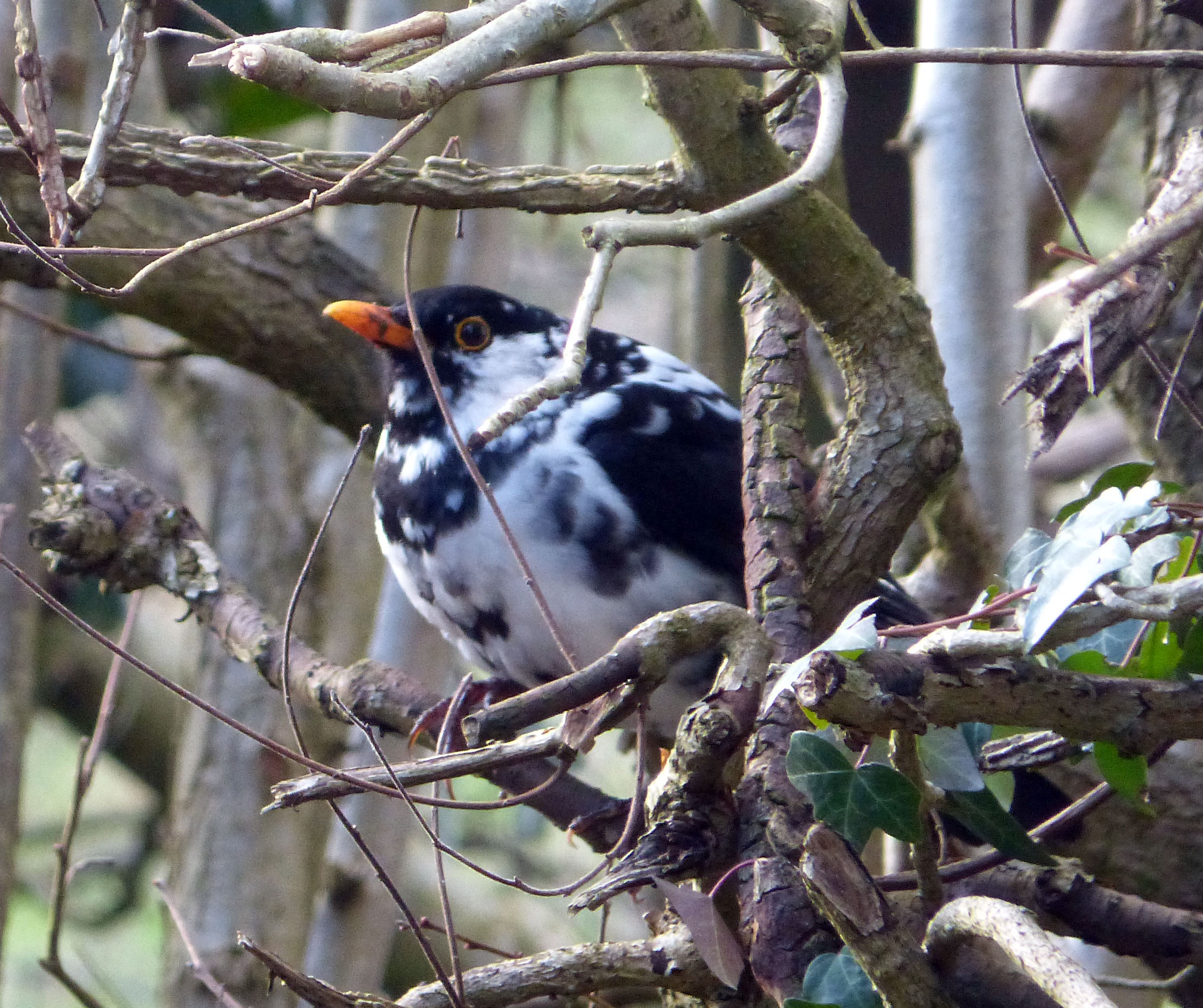
A leucistic adult male in England with much white in the plumage

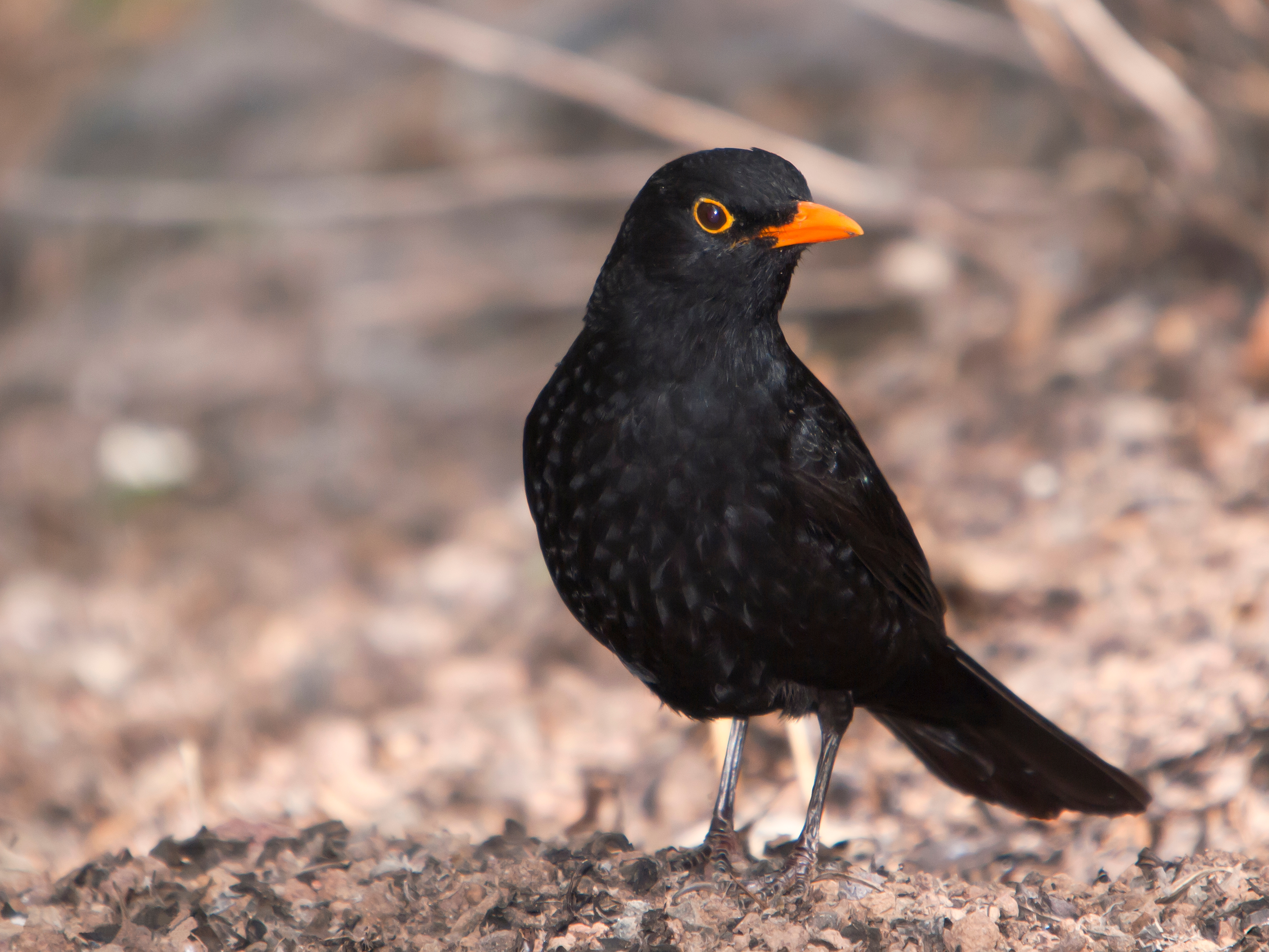
T. m. cabrerae on Gran Canaria, Canary Islands, Spain

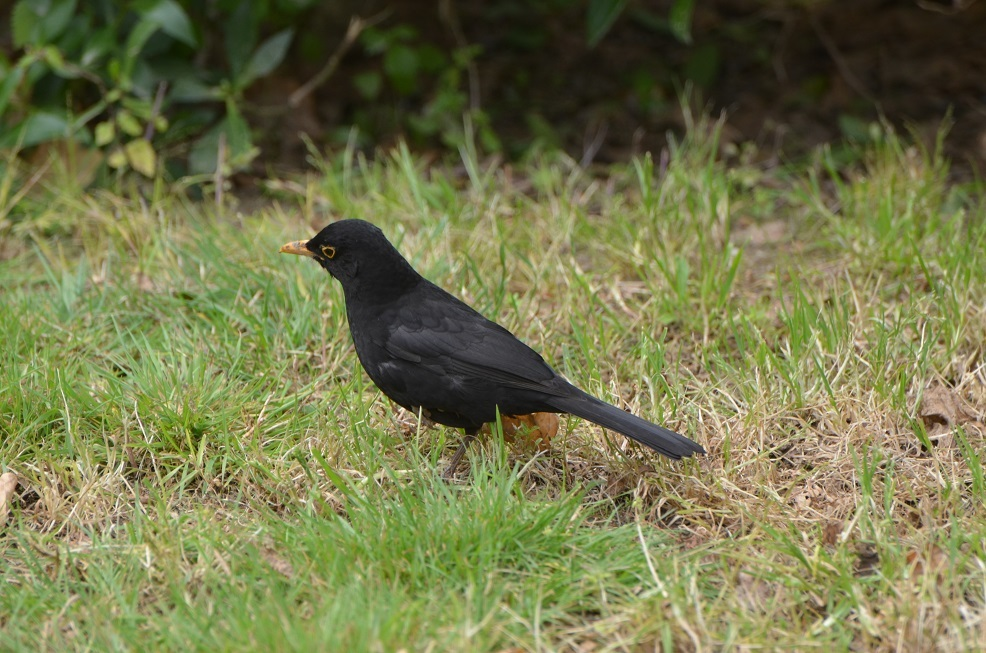
T. m. mauritanicus in Tunisia

=== Similar species ===
In Europe, the common blackbird can be confused with the paler-winged first-winter ring ouzel (Turdus torquatus) or the superficially similar common starling (Sturnus vulgaris). A number of similar Turdus thrushes exist far outside the range of the common blackbird, for example the South American Chiguanco thrush (Turdus chiguanco). The Indian blackbird (Turdus simillimus), the Tibetan blackbird (Turdus maximus), and the Chinese blackbird (Turdus mandarinus) were formerly treated as subspecies of the common blackbird.

== Description ==
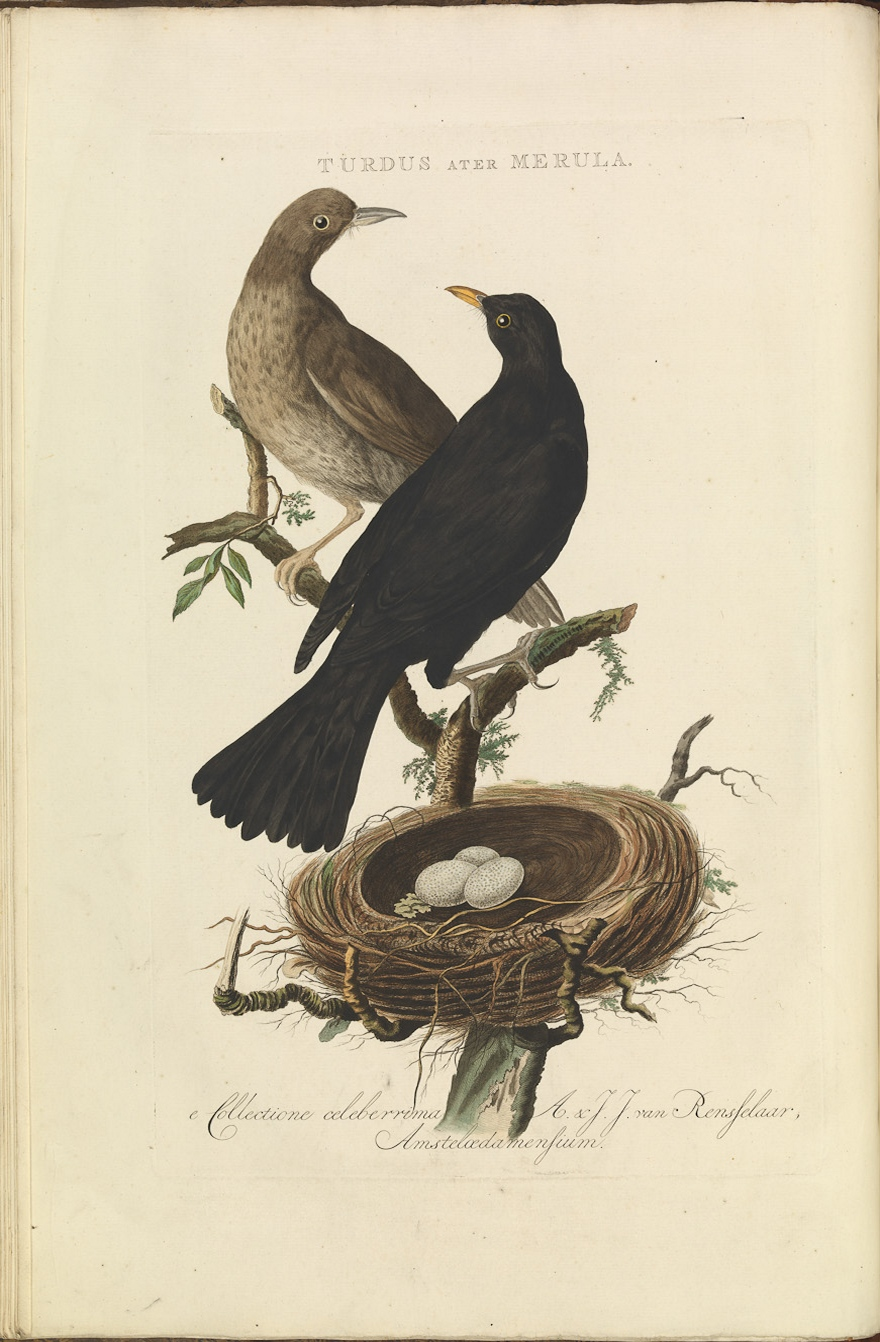
Historic image of blackbirds in Nederlandsche Vogelen (1770)

The common blackbird of the nominate subspecies T. m. merula is 23.5–29 cm (9.3–11.4 in) in length, has a long tail, and weighs 80–125 g (2.8–4.4 oz). The adult male has glossy black plumage, blackish-brown legs, a yellow eye-ring and an orange-yellow bill. Its bill darkens somewhat in winter. The adult female is sooty-brown with a dull yellowish-brownish bill, a brownish-white throat and some weak mottling on the breast. The juvenile is similar to the female, but has pale spots on its upperparts, and the very young juvenile also has a speckled breast. Young birds vary in shade of brown, darker birds are presumably male. The first year male resembles the adult male, but has a dark bill and weaker eye ring. Its folded wing is brown, rather than black like the body plumage.

== Distribution and habitat ==
The common blackbird breeds in temperate Eurasia, North Africa, the Canary Islands, and South Asia. It has also been introduced to Australia and New Zealand. Populations in the south and west of its range are sedentary, although northern birds migrate south as far as northern Africa and tropical Asia in winter. Urban males are more likely to overwinter in cooler climes than rural males, an adaptation made feasible by the warmer microclimate and relatively abundant food that allow the birds to establish territories and start reproducing earlier in the year. Recoveries of blackbirds ringed on the Isle of May show that these birds commonly migrate from southern Norway (or from as far north as Trondheim) to Scotland, and some onwards to Ireland. Scottish-ringed birds have also been recovered in England, Belgium, the Netherlands, Denmark, and Sweden. Female blackbirds in Scotland and the north of England migrate more (to Ireland) in winter than do the males.

This species is common over most of its range in woodland and has a preference for deciduous trees with dense undergrowth. However, gardens provide the best breeding habitat, supporting up to 7.3 pairs per hectare (nearly three pairs per acre), with woodland typically holding about a tenth of that density, and open and very built-up habitats even less. They are often replaced by the related ring ouzel in areas of higher altitude. The common blackbird also lives in parks, gardens and hedgerows.

The common blackbird occurs at elevations of up to 1,000 m (3,300 ft) in Europe, 2,300 m (7,500 ft) in North Africa, and at 900–1,820 m (2,950–5,970 ft) in peninsular India and Sri Lanka, but the large Himalayan subspecies range much higher, with T. m. maximus breeding at 3,200–4,800 m (10,500–15,700 ft) and remaining above 2,100 m (6,900 ft) even in winter.

This widespread species has been recorded as a vagrant in many locations outside of its normal range in Eurasia, but records from North America are usually thought to be of escaped birds, such as the bird recorded in Quebec in 1971. However, a 1994 record from Bonavista, Newfoundland, has been accepted as a genuine wild bird, and the species is therefore on the North American list.

== Behaviour and ecology ==
The male common blackbird defends its breeding territory by chasing away other males or performing a "bow and run" threat display. This consists of a short run followed by the bird raising its head then bowing it downward with its tail dipped simultaneously. If male blackbirds do fight, it is usually brief and the intruder is quickly chased away. The female blackbird is also aggressive in the spring when competing with other females for a good nesting territory. Although fights are less frequent, they tend to be more violent.

The appearance of the bill is important in the interactions of the common blackbird. The male defending his territory responds more aggressively to models with orange bills than to those with yellow ones, and least of all to the brown bill colour typical of first-year males. However, the female is relatively indifferent to bill colour and instead responds to shinier bills.

As long as there is food available in winter, both male and females will remain in the territory throughout the year, although they will occupy different areas. Migrants are more sociable, travelling in small flocks and feeding in loose groups in their wintering grounds. The flight of migrating birds comprises bursts of rapid wing beats interspersed with level or diving movement. This differs from both the normal, fast, agile flight of this species, as well as the dipping action of larger thrushes.

=== Breeding ===
The male common blackbird attracts the female with a courtship display consisting of oblique runs combined with head-bowing movements, an open beak, and a "strangled" low song. The female remains motionless until she raises her head and tail to permit copulation. This species is monogamous and established pairs will usually stay together for as long as they both survive. Pair separation rates of up to 20% have been noted following poor breeding. Although the species is socially monogamous, there have been studies showing as much as 17% extra-pair paternity.

The nominate T. merula may commence breeding in March, but the eastern and Indian races start a month or more later. The introduced New Zealand birds begin nesting in August (late winter). The breeding pair look for a suitable nest site in a creeper or bush, favouring evergreen or thorny species such as ivy, holly, hawthorn, honeysuckle or pyracantha. Sometimes the birds will nest in sheds or outbuildings where a ledge or cavity is used. The cup-shaped nest is made with grasses, leaves and other vegetation, bound together with mud. It is built by the female alone. She lays three to five (usually four) bluish-green eggs marked with reddish-brown blotches, heaviest at the larger end; the eggs of nominate T. merula are 2.9 cm × 2.1 cm (1.14 in × 0.83 in) in size and weigh 7.2 g (0.25 oz), of which 6% is shell. Eggs of birds of the southern Indian races are paler than those from the northern subcontinent and Europe.

The female incubates the eggs for 12–14 days before the altricial chicks hatch, naked and blind. Fledging takes another 10–19 (average 13.6) days, during which time both parents feed the young and remove the faecal sacs. The nest is often poorly concealed compared to those of other species, and many breeding attempts fail due to predation. The young are fed by their parents for up to three weeks after leaving the nest, and will follow the adults begging for food. If the female starts another nest, the male alone feeds the fledglings. Second broods are common, and the female will reuse the same nest if the first brood was successful. Three broods may be raised in the south of the common blackbird's range.

A common blackbird has an average life expectancy of 2.4 years, and, based on data from bird ringing, the oldest recorded age is 21 years and 10 months.

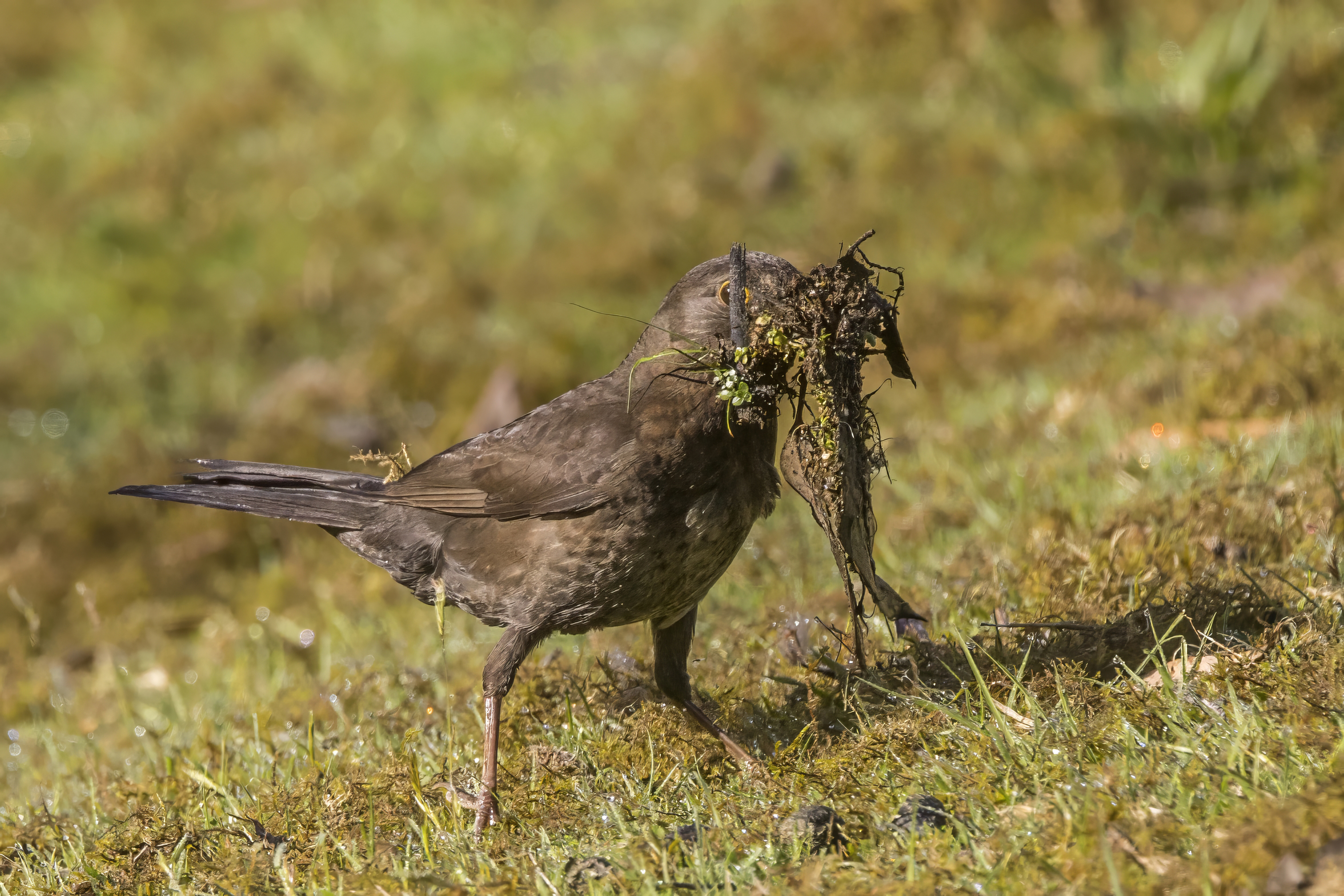
Female with nesting material

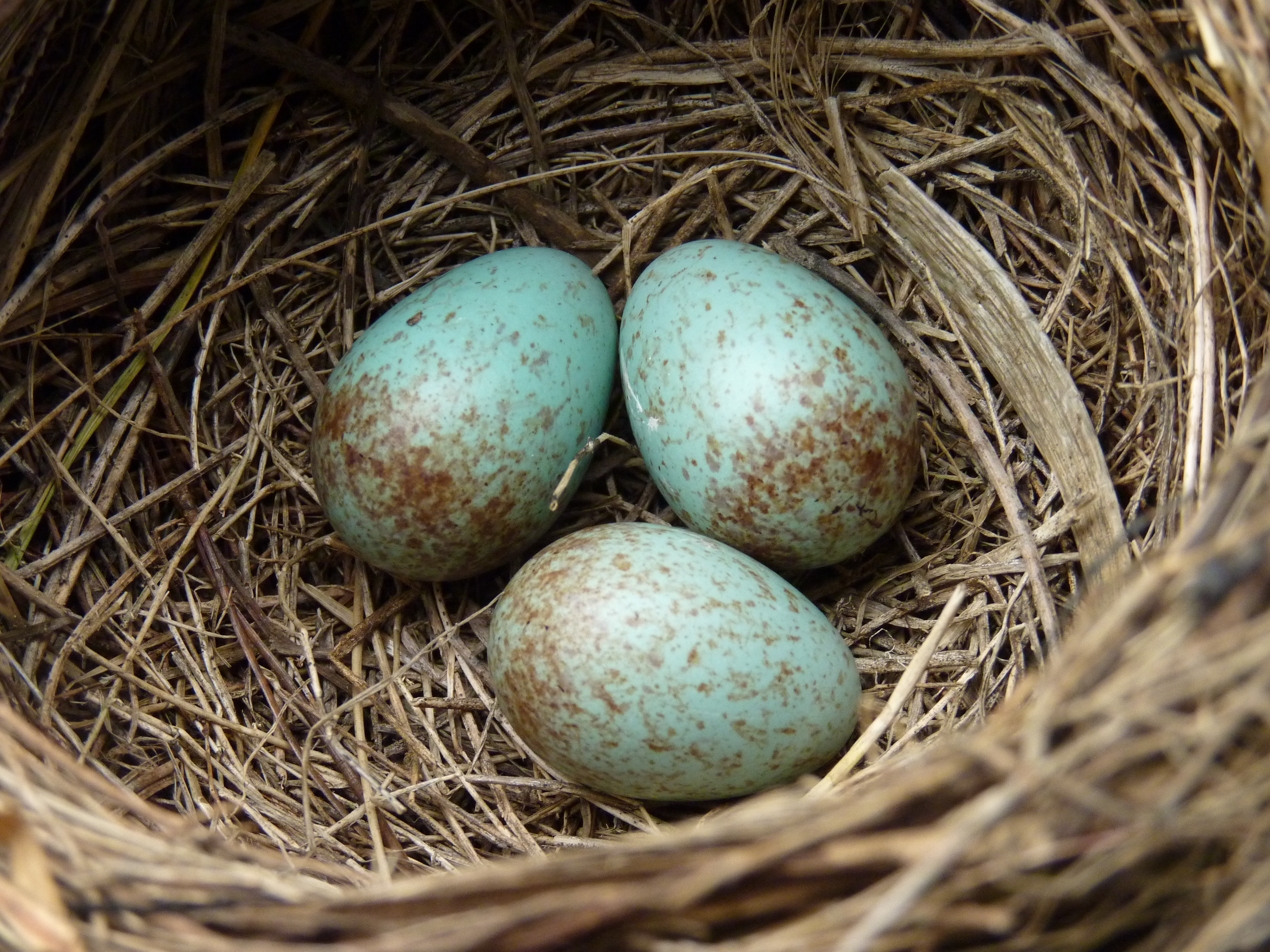
Eggs in a nest

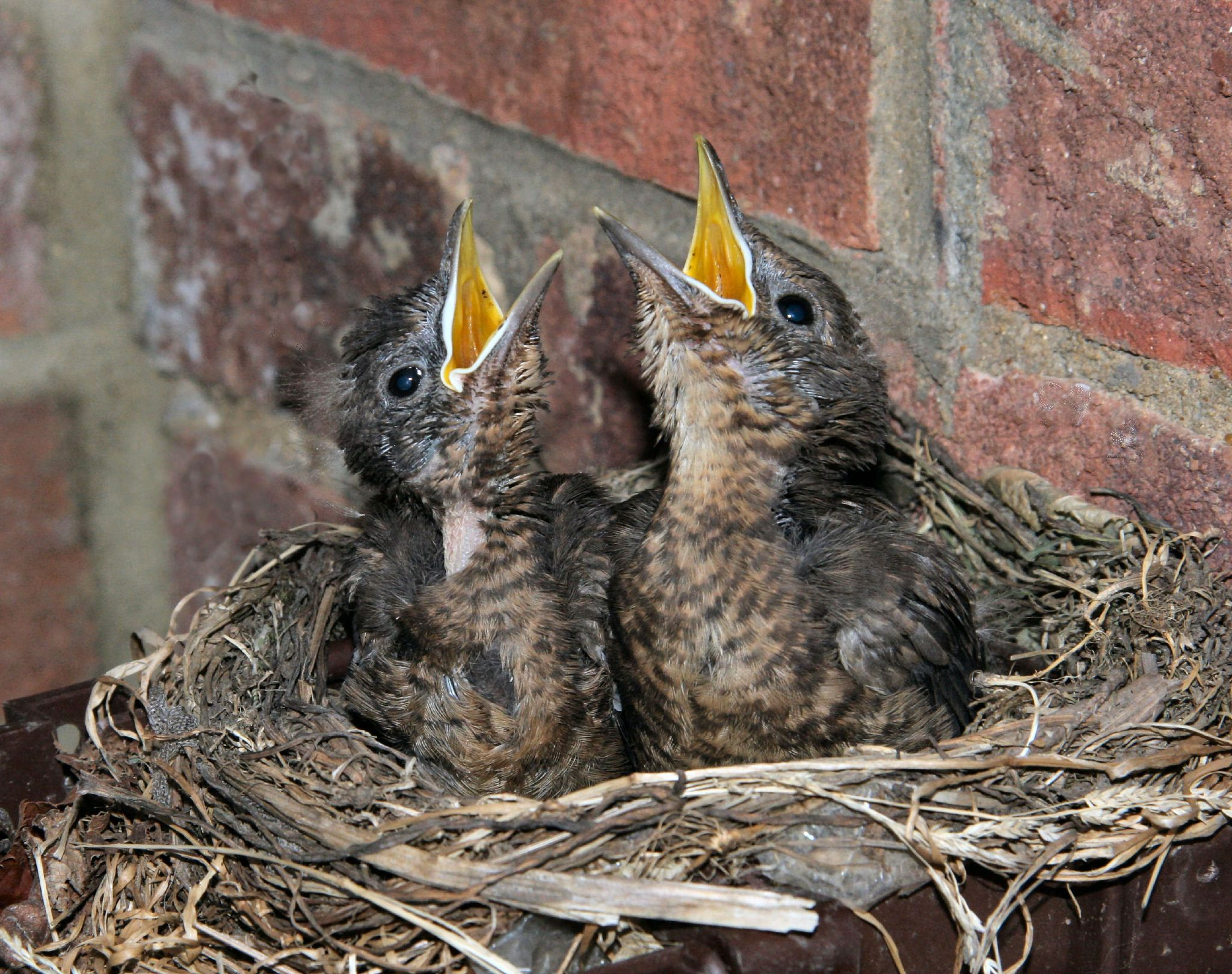
Two chicks in a nest

Blackbird fledgelings being fed

Male feeding chicks

Common blackbird foraging in Norfolk, England

A common blackbird eating figs near Toulouse, France

Feeding chick and removing faecal sac

=== Songs and calls ===
noicon

Song 1

noicon

Song 2

noicon

Song 3

noicon

Song 4

noicon

Alarm calls

In its native range in the Northern Hemisphere, the first-year male common blackbird of the nominate race may start singing as early as late January in fine weather in order to establish a territory. This is followed in late March by the adult male. The male's song is a varied, melodious, low-pitched fluted warble sung from trees, rooftops and other elevated perches mainly in the period from March to June, sometimes into the beginning of July. It has a number of other calls, including an aggressive seee, a pook-pook-pook alarm for terrestrial predators like cats, and various chink and chook, chook vocalisations. The territorial male invariably gives chink-chink calls in the evening in an attempt (usually unsuccessful) to deter other blackbirds from roosting in its territory overnight. During the northern winter, blackbirds can be heard quietly singing to themselves, so much so that September and October are the only months in which the song cannot be heard. Like other passerine birds, it has a thin high seee alarm call for threats from birds of prey since the sound is rapidly attenuated in vegetation, making the source difficult to locate.

The nominate subspecies T. m. merula is known to mimic sounds in the local environment, including the songs of other birds, as well as human-made sounds, such as whistling and car alarms.

=== Feeding ===
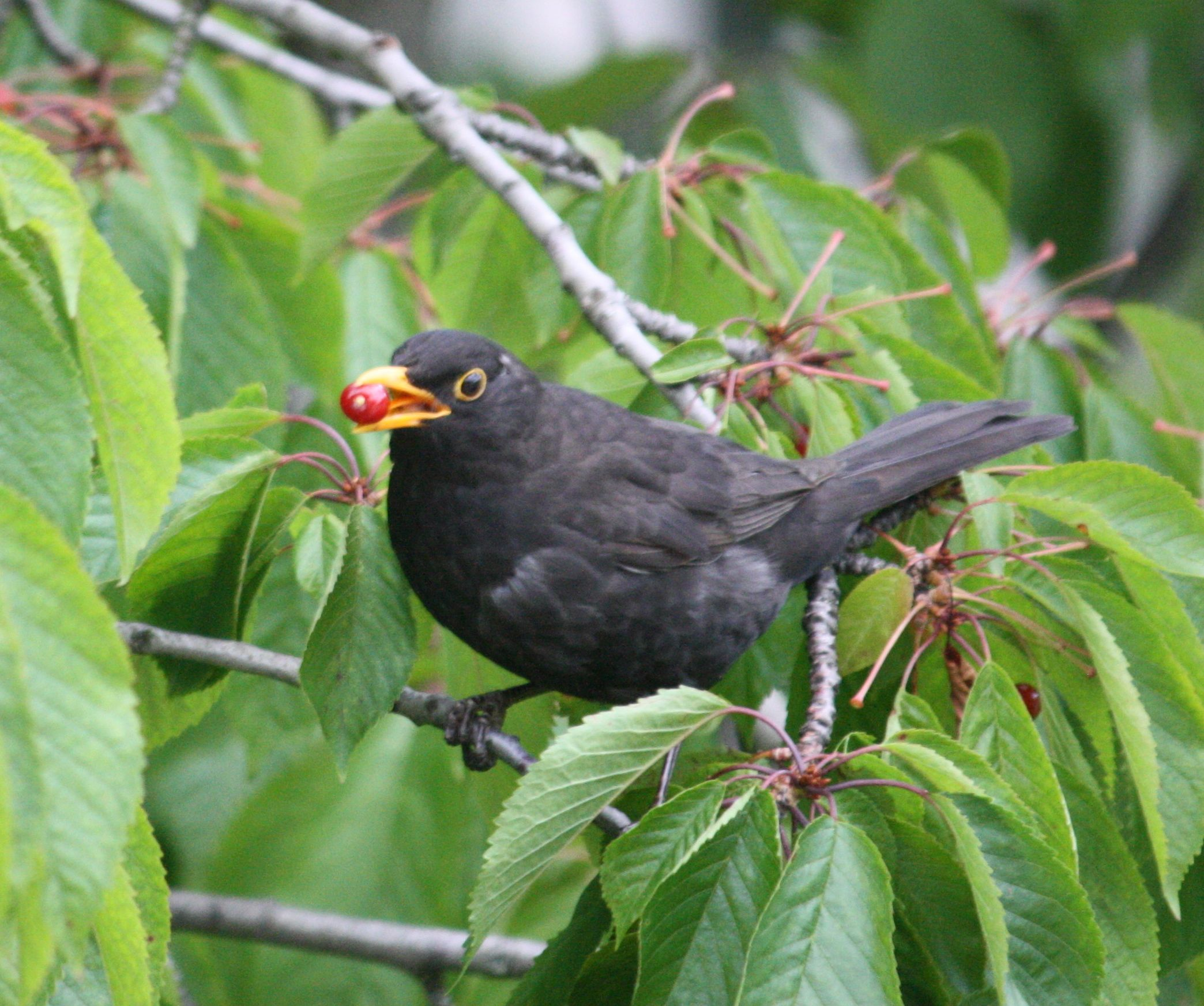
Adult male feeding on cherries in Lausanne, Switzerland

The common blackbird is omnivorous, eating a wide range of insects, earthworms, seeds and berries. It feeds mainly on the ground, running and hopping in a start-stop-start manner. It pulls earthworms from the soil, usually finding them by sight but sometimes also by hearing, and searches through leaf litter for other invertebrates. Small amphibians, lizards and, on rare occasions, small mammals are also occasionally hunted. This species will also perch in bushes to take berries and collect caterpillars and other active insects.

=== Natural threats ===
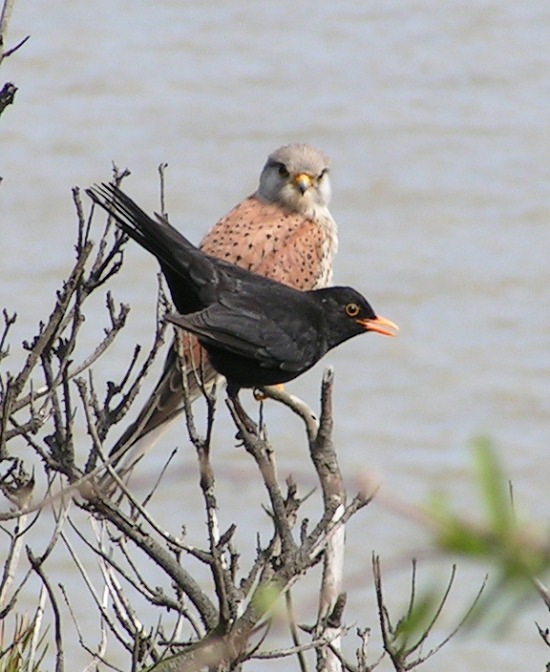
A male blackbird attempting to distract a male kestrel close to its nest

Near human settlements the main predators of the common blackbird are domestic cats, and newly fledged young are especially vulnerable. Foxes and predatory birds, such as the sparrowhawk and other accipiters, also prey on this species when the opportunity arises. However, there is little direct evidence to show that either predation of the adult blackbirds or loss of the eggs and chicks to corvids, such as the European magpie or Eurasian jay, decrease population numbers.

This species is occasionally a host to parasitic cuckoos, such as the common cuckoo (Cuculus canorus), but this is rare because the common blackbird recognises the adult and the non-mimetic eggs of the parasitic species. In the UK, only three nests of 59,770 examined (0.005%) contained cuckoo eggs. The introduced merula blackbird in New Zealand, where the cuckoo does not occur, has, over the past 130 years, lost the ability to recognize the adult common cuckoo but still rejects non-mimetic eggs.

As with other passerine birds, parasites are common. Intestinal parasites were found in 88% of common blackbirds, most frequently Isospora and Capillaria species. and more than 80% had haematozoan parasites (Leucocytozoon, Plasmodium, Haemoproteus and Trypanosoma species).

Common blackbirds spend much of their time looking for food on the ground where they can become infested with ticks. These are external parasites that most commonly attach to the head of a blackbird. In France, 74% of rural blackbirds were found to be infested with Ixodes ticks, whereas, only 2% of blackbirds living in urban habitats were infested. This is partly because it is more difficult for ticks to find another host on lawns and gardens in urban areas than in uncultivated rural areas, and partly because ticks are generally more common in rural areas, where a variety of tick hosts, such as foxes, deer and boar, are more numerous. Although ixodid ticks can transmit pathogenic viruses and bacteria, and are known to transmit Borrelia bacteria to birds, there is no evidence that this affects the fitness of blackbirds except when they are exhausted and run down after migration.

The common blackbird is one of several species that exhibits unihemispheric slow-wave sleep. In this state, one hemisphere of the brain is effectively asleep, while a low-voltage EEG, characteristic of wakefulness, is present in the other. This allows the bird to rest in areas of high predation or during long migratory flights while retaining a degree of alertness.

== Status and conservation ==
The common blackbird has an extensive range, estimated at 32.4 million square kilometres (12.5 million square miles), and a large population, including an estimated 79 to 160 million individuals in Europe alone. The species is not believed to approach the thresholds for the population decline criterion of the IUCN Red List (i.e., a decline of more than 30% in ten years or three generations), and is therefore categorised as least concern. In the western Palearctic, populations are generally stable or increasing, but there have been local declines, especially on farmland, which may be due to agricultural policies that encouraged farmers to remove hedgerows (which provide nesting places), and to drain damp grassland and increase the use of pesticides, both of which could have reduced the availability of invertebrate food.

The common blackbird was introduced to Australia by a bird dealer visiting Melbourne in early 1857, and has since spread from Melbourne and Adelaide to include all of south-eastern Australia, including Tasmania and the Bass Strait islands. The introduced population in Australia is considered a pest because it damages a variety of soft fruits in orchards, parks and gardens, including berries, cherries, stone fruit and grapes. It is thought to spread weeds, such as blackberry, and may compete with native birds for food and nesting sites.

The introduced common blackbird is the most widely distributed avian seed disperser in New Zealand, alongside the native silvereye (Zosterops lateralis). Introduced there along with the song thrush (Turdus philomelos) in 1862, it has spread throughout the country up to an elevation of 1,500 metres (4,921 ft), as well as to outlying islands such as the Campbell and Kermadecs. It eats a wide range of native and exotic fruit, and makes a major contribution to the development of communities of naturalised woody weeds. These communities provide fruit more suited to non-endemic native birds and naturalised birds than to endemic birds.

The number of blackbirds in Europe has been significantly reduced by the Usutu virus which is spread by mosquitoes. This was detected in Italy in 1996 and has since spread to other countries including Germany and the UK.

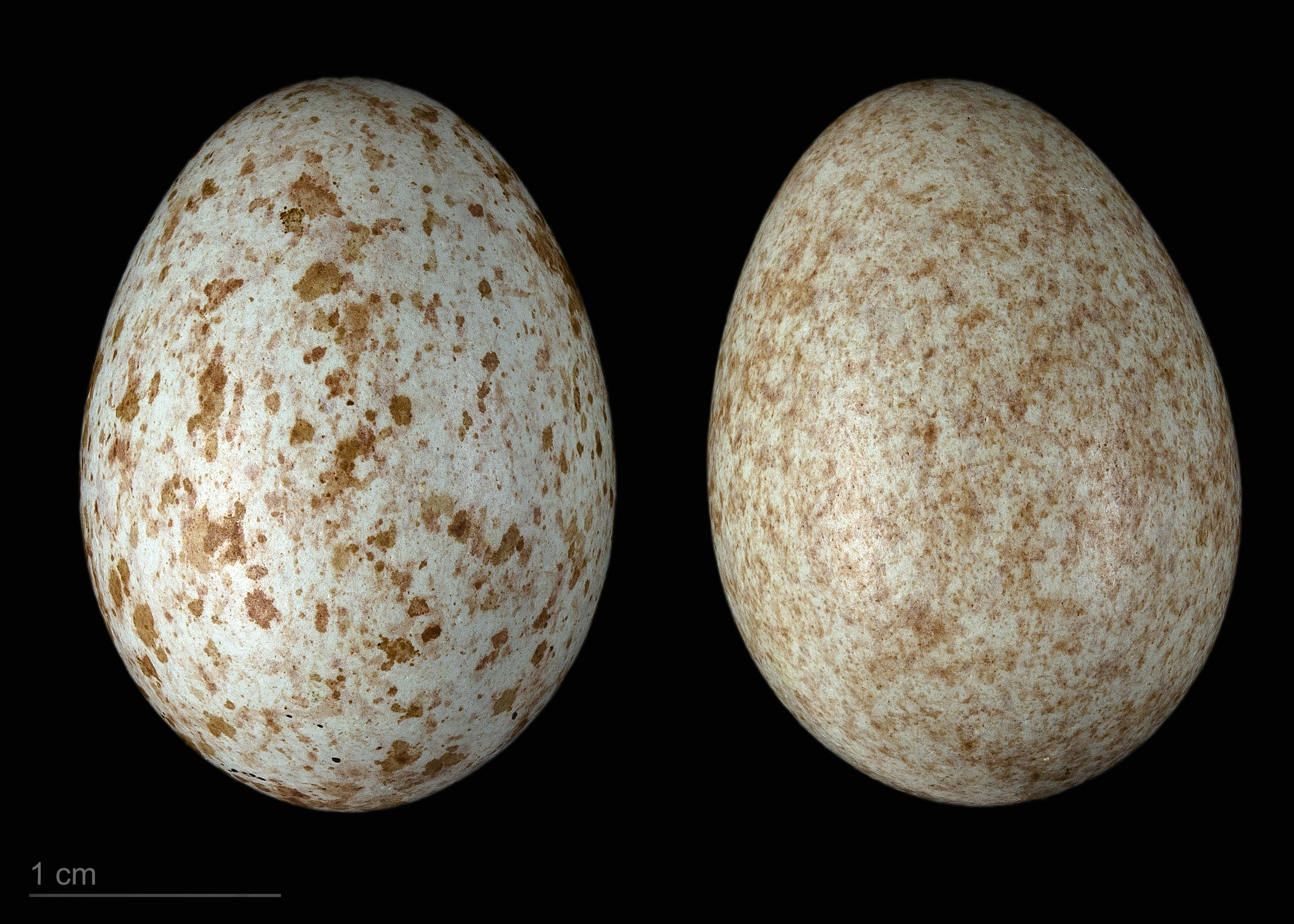
Turdus merula cabrerae - MHNT

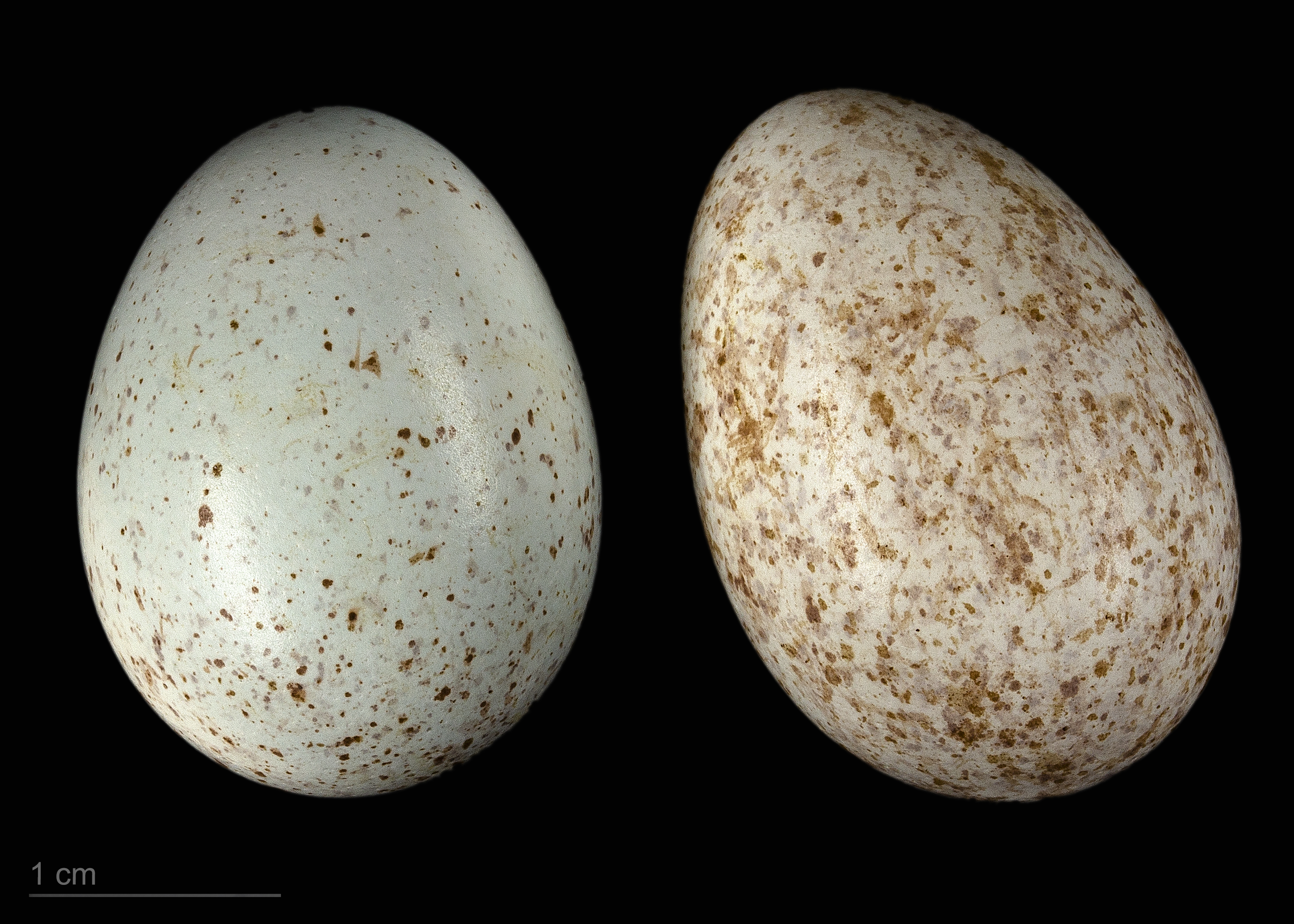
Turdus merula merula - MHNT

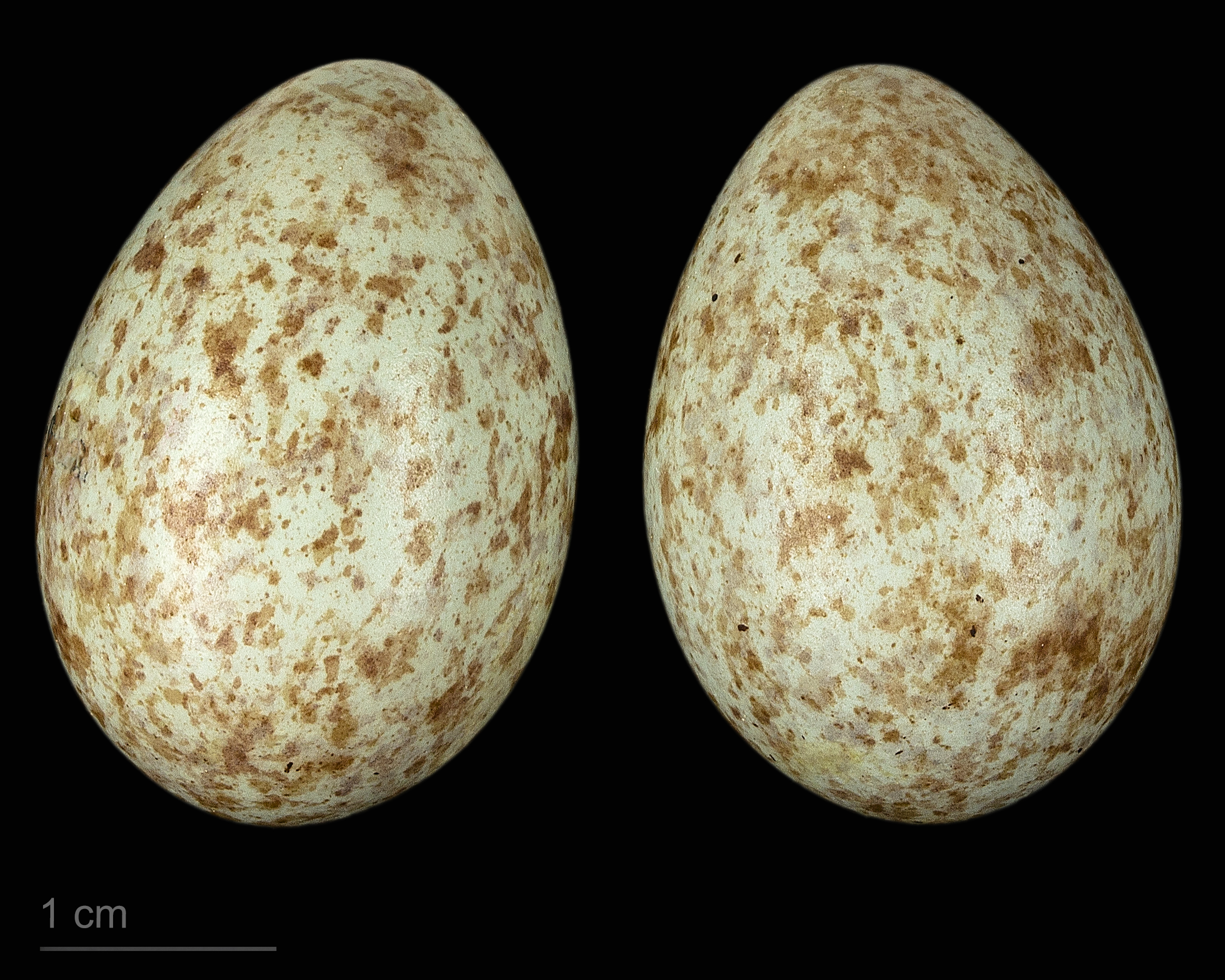
Turdus merula mauritanicus - MHNT

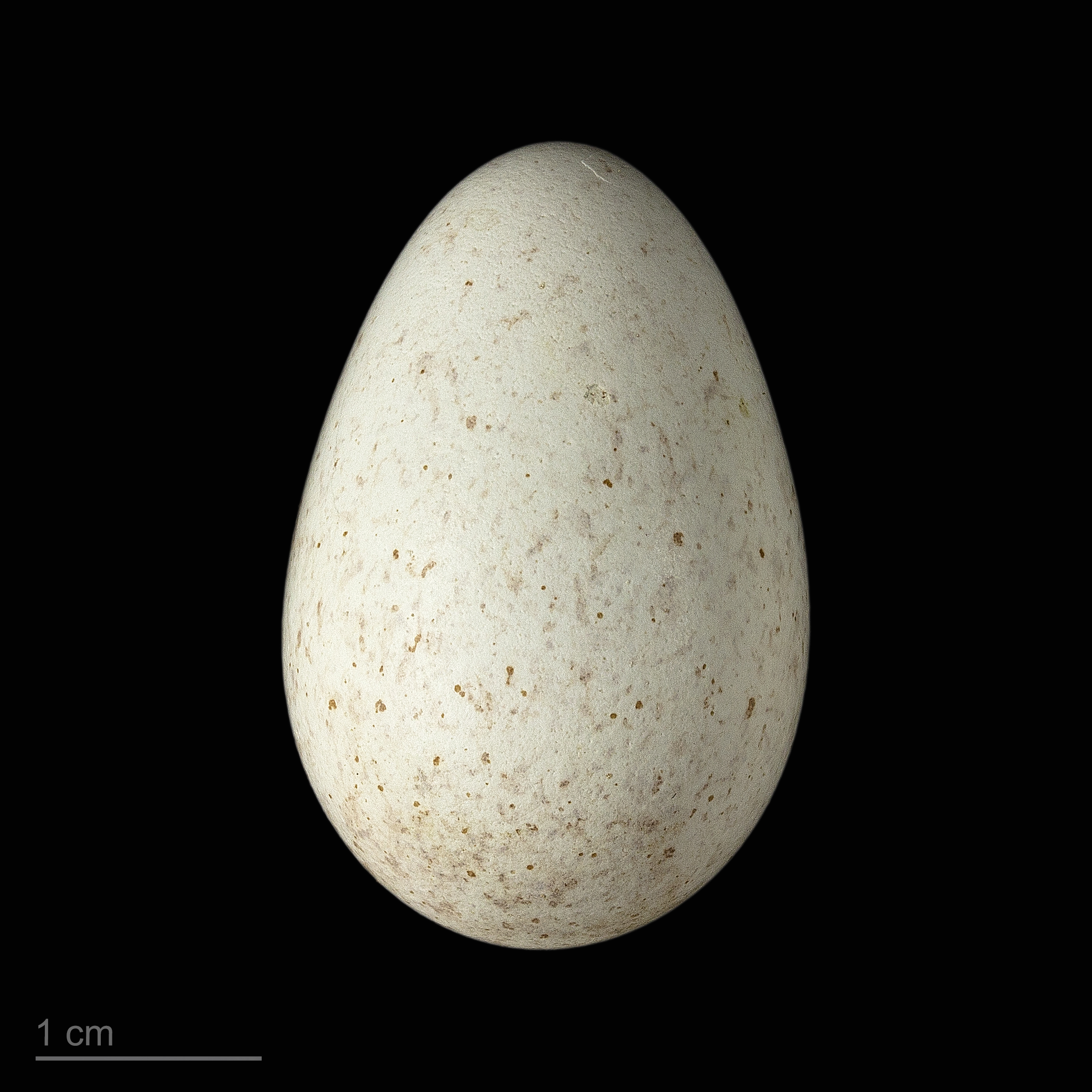
Turdus merula azorensis - MHNT

== In popular culture ==
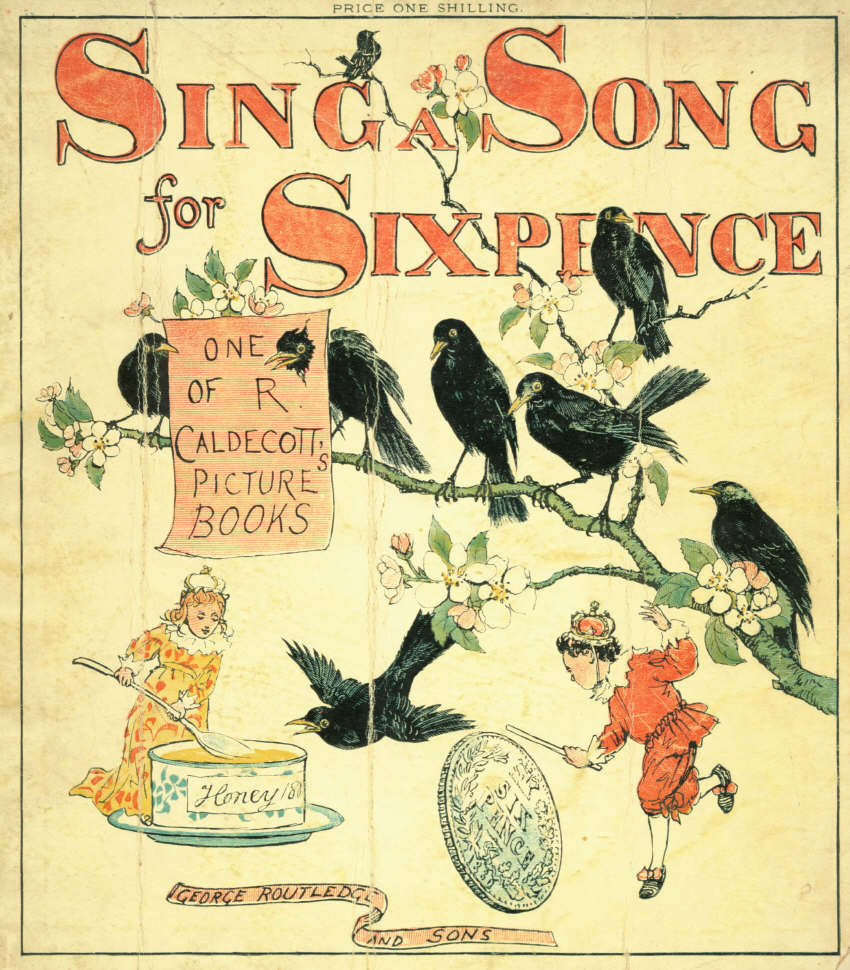
"Sing a Song for Sixpence" cover illustration

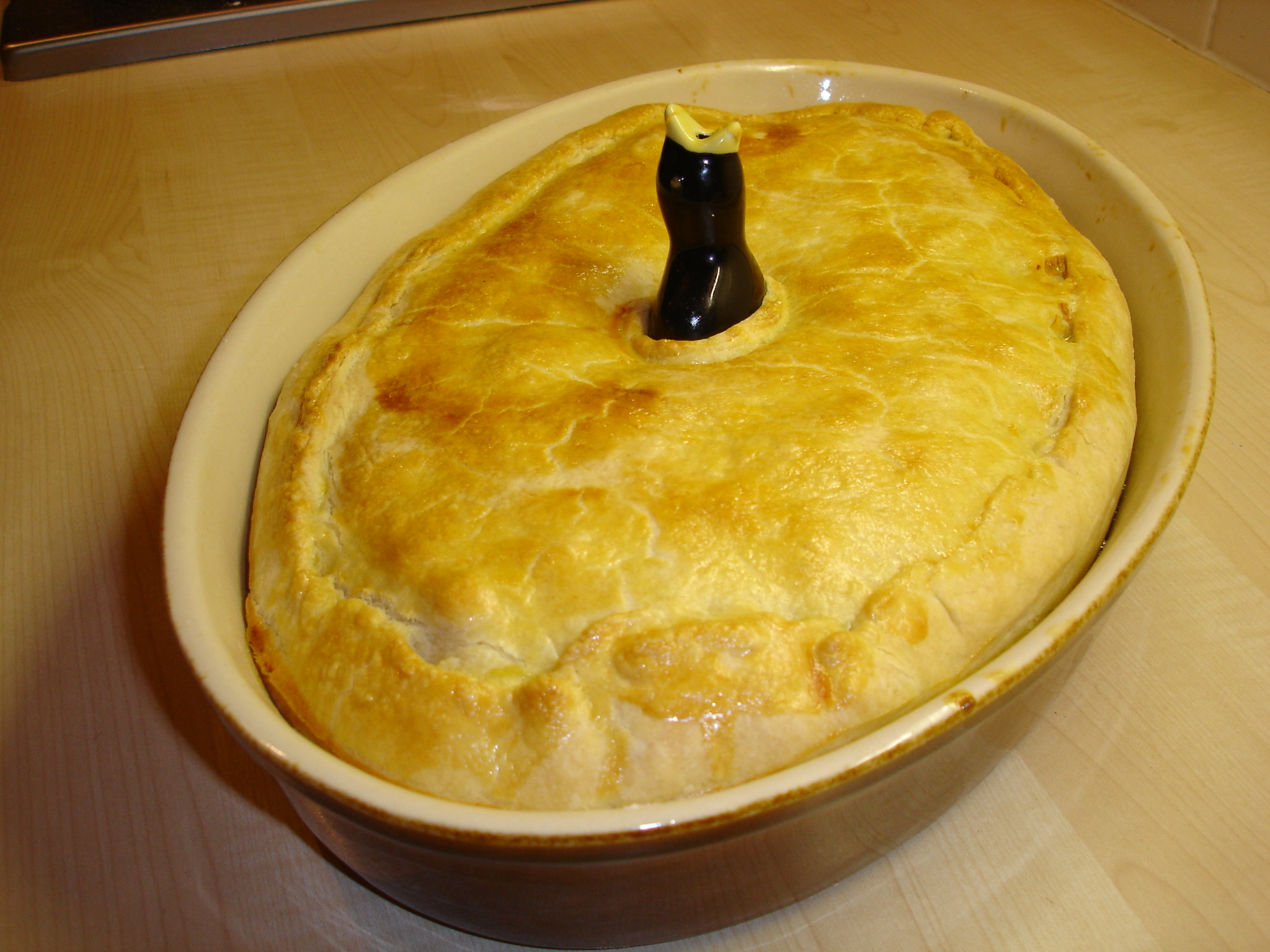
A pie with a traditional pie bird in the shape of a blackbird

In Classical Greek folklore, the common blackbird was regarded as a sacred yet destructive bird, and it was said that it would die if it consumed pomegranates. Like many other small birds, it has in the past been trapped in rural areas at its night roosts as an easily available addition to the diet. In medieval times the practice of placing live birds under a pie crust just before serving may have been the origin of the familiar nursery rhyme:

Sing a song of sixpence,
A pocket full of rye;
Four and twenty blackbirds baked in a pie!
When the pie was opened the birds began to sing,

Oh, wasn't that a dainty dish to set before the king?

The common blackbird's melodious, distinctive song is mentioned in the poem Adlestrop by Edward Thomas;

And for that minute a blackbird sang

Close by, and round him, mistier,
Farther and farther, all the birds

Of Oxfordshire and Gloucestershire.

In the English Christmas carol "The Twelve Days of Christmas", the line commonly sung today as "four calling birds" is believed to have originally been written in the 18th century as "four colly birds", an archaism meaning "black as coal" that was a popular English nickname for the common blackbird.

The common blackbird, unlike many black creatures, is not normally seen as a symbol of bad luck, but R. S. Thomas wrote that there is "a suggestion of dark Places about it", and it symbolised resignation in the 17th century tragic play The Duchess of Malfi; an alternate connotation is vigilance, the bird's clear cry warning of danger.

The common blackbird is the national bird of Sweden, which has a breeding population of 1–2 million pairs, and was featured on a 30 öre Christmas postage stamp in 1970; it has also featured on a number of other stamps issued by European and Asian countries, including a 1966 4d British stamp and a 1998 Irish 30p stamp. This bird also gives rise to the Serbian name for Kosovo (and Metohija), which is the possessive adjectival form of Serbian kos ("blackbird") as in Kosovo Polje ("Blackbird Field").

A common blackbird can be heard singing on the Beatles song "Blackbird" as a symbol of the civil rights movement.
