= Cornelius Nozeman =

Dutch Remonstrant churchman and naturalist

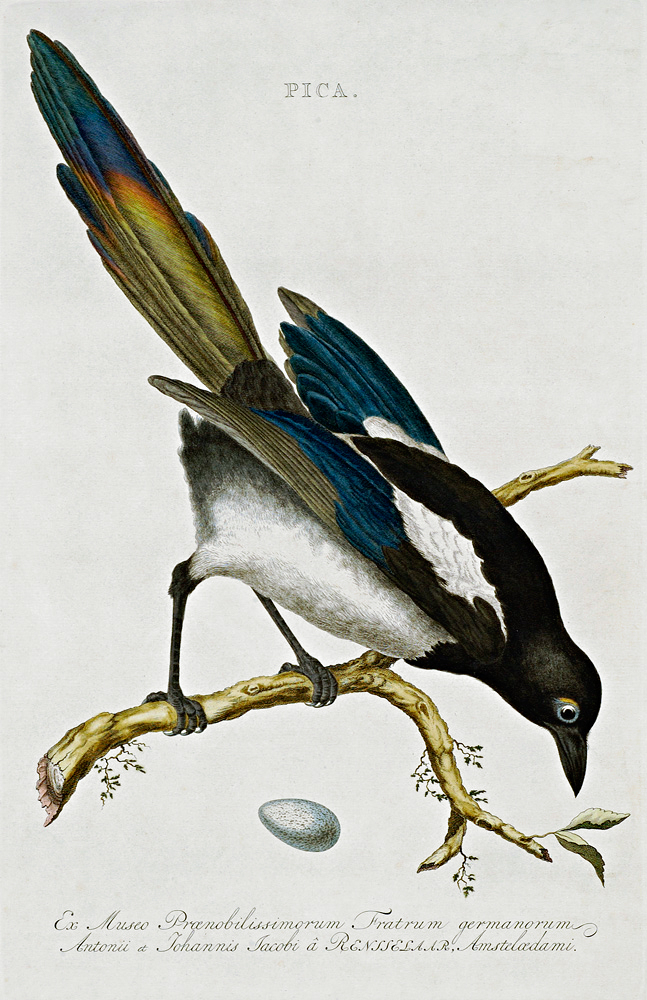
Pica pica the Magpie. Plate by Jan Christiaan Sepp in Nederlandsche Vogelen

Cornelius Nozeman (15 August 1720 – 22 July 1786), also Cornelis Nozeman, was a Dutch Remonstrant churchman and naturalist.

== Biography ==
He was born in Amsterdam as the son of the composer Jacobus Nozeman. He was trained as a preacher and called to Alkmaar where he served 1744–1749. There he began to conduct science experiments in his free time. In 1749 he was called to serve in Haarlem, where he became a supporter of the founding of the society Hollandsche Maatschappij der Wetenschappen. According to his biographer A.J. van der Aa, he would have become a member of that society except he had an argument with one of the directors based on "two letters to anonymous", that he wrote in 1751 and 1752. This was probably A.J. van der Aa's grandfather, Christianus Carolus Henricus van der Aa (1718–1793), a Lutheran minister in Haarlem and secretary to the society, who like Nozeman also had worked in Alkmaar before coming to Haarlem. In 1755 he purchased a small publishing business in Haarlem, which he kept on for a few years after leaving Haarlem. In 1759 Nozeman was called to serve in Rotterdam, and in 1760 he offered to sell his cabinet of fish and fossils for 100 silver ducats to the young society. The deal did not go through, possibly because of this difference between the two men.

It was in Rotterdam that he began preparations for his great work on Nederlandsche Vogelen (Birds of the Netherlands) that was published in installments by Christiaan Sepp starting in 1770. This work, finished well after both men had died in 1829, was the first "encyclopedic" book of the birds of the Netherlands (at that time including the area known today as Belgium). It was illustrated by Jan Christiaan Sepp and published by the naturalist Maarten Houttuyn. In 1767 he was awarded an honorary membership in the newly formed Maatschappij der Nederlandse Letterkunde and in 1769 he was himself one of the founders of the Rotterdam society Bataafsch Genootschap der Proefondervindelijke wijsbegeerte. In 1778, he was awarded honorary membership in the Provinciaal Utrechts Genootschap. He died in Moordrecht in 1786.
