= Jacobus Nozeman =

Dutch composer

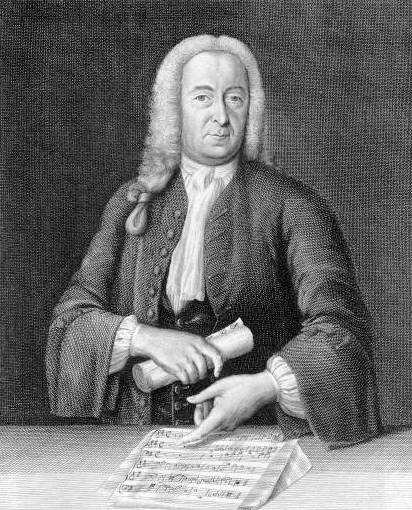
Engraving of Nozeman by C. F. Fritzsch

Jacobus Nozeman (also Noseman; 30 August 1693 – 10 October 1745) was a Dutch baroque composer, organist and violinist.

== Biography ==
Nozeman was born in Hamburg to Johannes Nozeman, a travelling actor, and Anna Rijndorp. He grew up in Den Haag and Leiden before moving to Amsterdam around 1710. In 1719, he was appointed first organist at the Remonstrant church in Amsterdam, a position he held until his death.

His son, Cornelius Nozeman, was a theologian and a naturalist.

== Music ==
Nozeman's surviving works include two collections of six violin sonatas and a collection of lieder. A collection of harpsichord pieces and another collection of violin sonatas are lost.
