= Nederlandsche vogelen =

Five-volume work on Dutch birds (1770–1829)

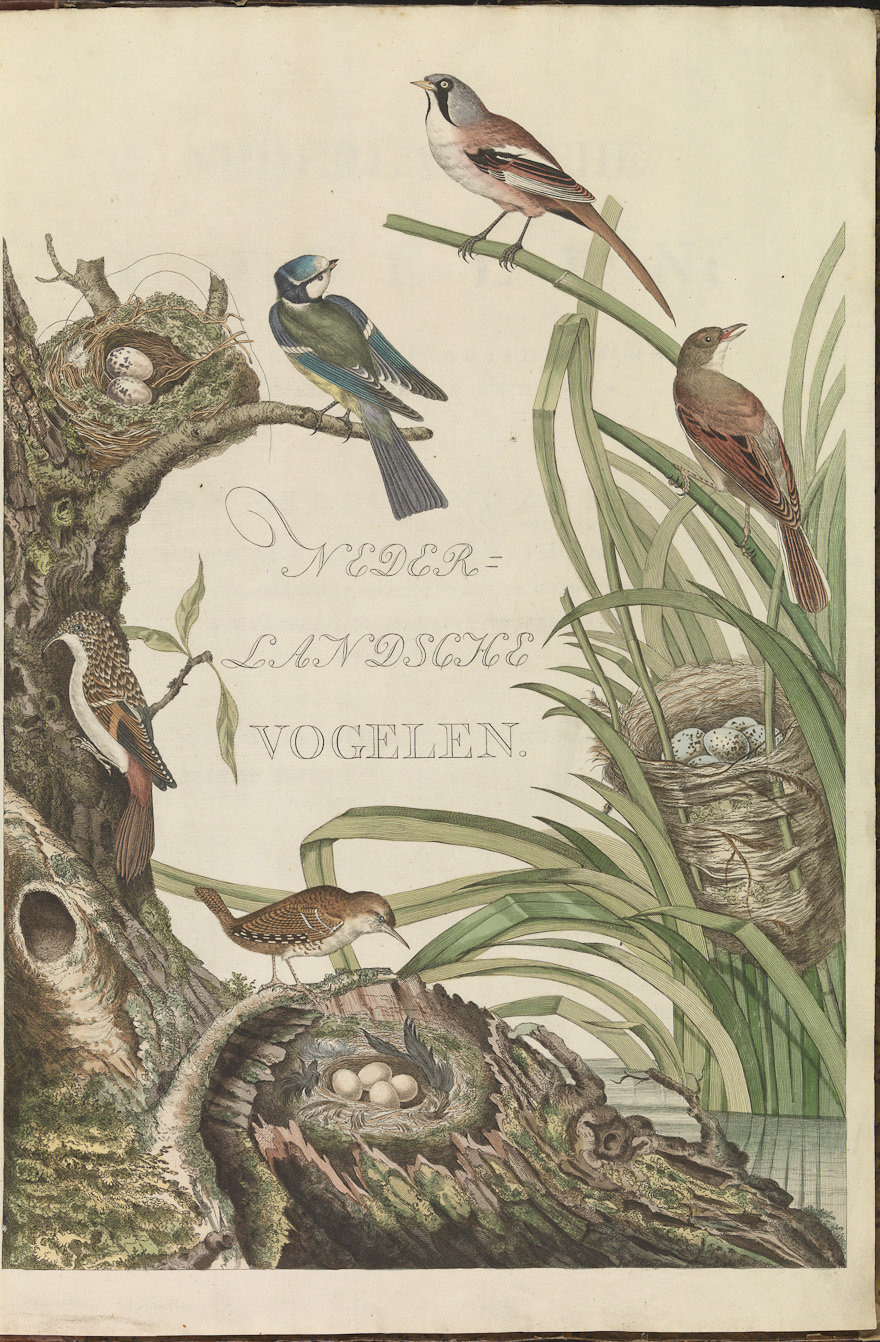
- Title page of Volume 1
- Author: Cornelius Nozeman, Martinus Houttuyn, Coenraad Jacob Temminck
- Illustrator: Christiaan Sepp
- Language: Dutch
- Series: 5 volumes
- Subject: Ornithology
- Publisher: Jan Christiaan Sepp
- Publication date: 1770-1829
- Publication place: Dutch Republic

Nederlandsche vogelen (English: Dutch birds) is a five volume Dutch natural history compendium, published in Amsterdam from 1770. It was published in installments and was finished in 1829. It was the first comprehensive avifauna of the Netherlands (which temporarily included Belgium during 1815 - 1830).

This monumental work was written by Cornelius Nozeman, and after his death by Martinus Houttuyn. The last volume was finished by Jan Sepp, with advice from Coenraad Jacob Temminck. The colored engravings were made by Christiaan Sepp, Jan Christiaan Sepp (his son), and Jan Sepp (his grandson).

Each volume contains 50 images of bird species. Apart from these images, each species is described on a few text pages.

== Bibliographic information ==
=== Volume 1 ===
Nederlandsche vogelen; volgens hunne huishouding, aert, en eigenschappen beschreeven door Nozeman, Cornelius. Alle naer 't leeven geheel nieuw en naeuwkeurig getekend, in ' t koper gebragt en natuurlyk gekoleurd door, en onder opzicht van Christiaan Sepp en Zoon. Amsterdam : J.C. Sepp en zoon, 1770.

(English: Dutch birds; with a description by Cornelius Nozeman, according to their housekeeping, nature and properties. Newly drawn after originals, engraved and naturally coloured, by and under supervision of Christiaan Sepp and son.)

=== Volume 2, 3, 4 en 5 ===
Nederlandsche vogelen; volgens hunne huishouding, aert, en eigenschappen beschreeven door Cornelius Nozeman [...] en verder, na zijn ed. overlyden, door Martinus Houttuyn. Alle naer ’t leeven geheel nieuw en naeuwkeurig getekend, in ’ t koper gebragt en natuurlyk gekoleurd door, en onder opzicht van Christiaan Sepp en Zoon. Amsterdam : J.C. Sepp en zoon, 1789 / 1797 / 1809 / 1829.
(English: Dutch birds; with a description by Cornelius Nozeman, according to their housekeeping, nature and properties - and after his death by Martinus Houttuyn. Newly drawn after originals, engraved and naturally coloured, by and under supervision of Christiaan Sepp and son.)

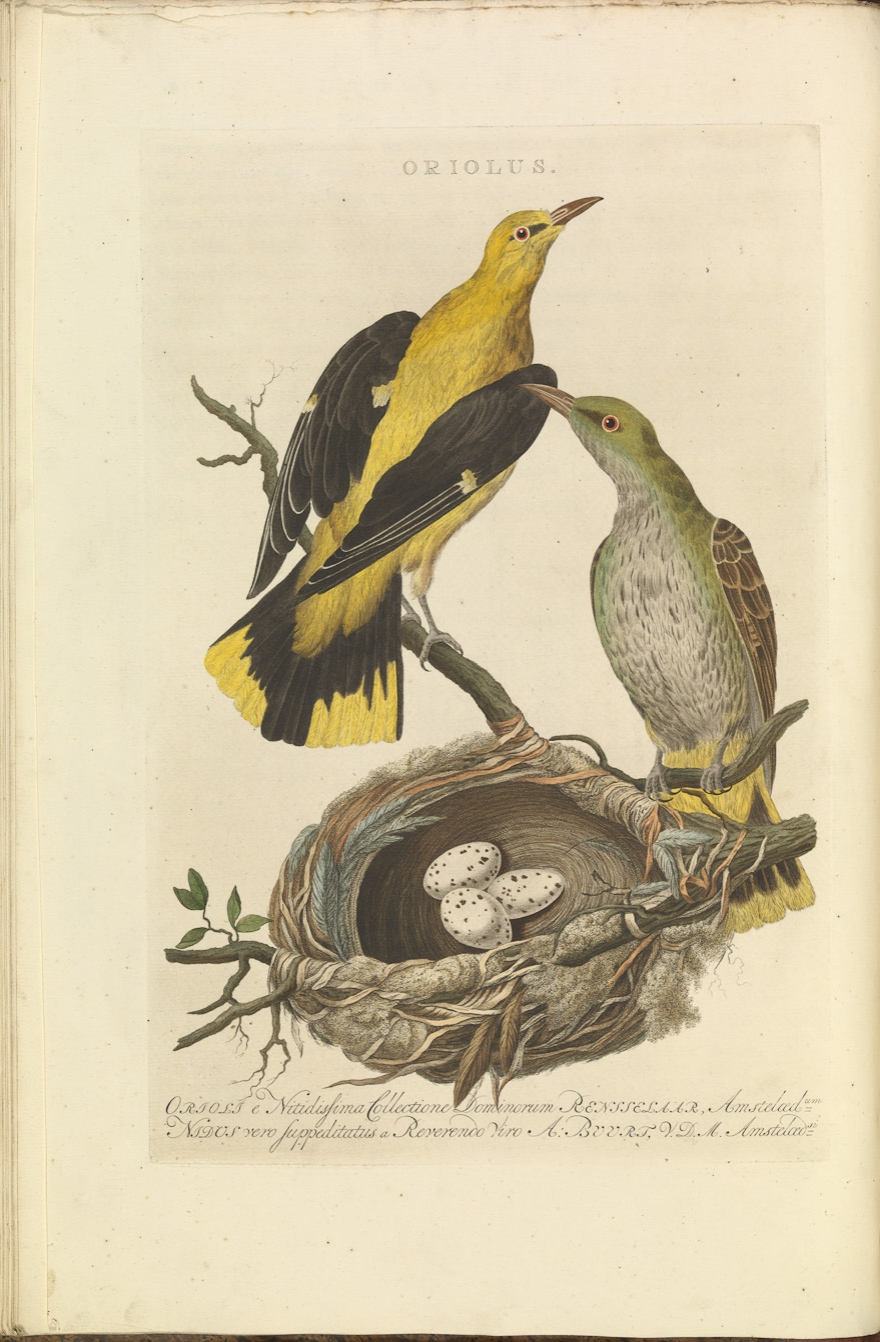
Oriolus oriolus (Eurasian golden oriole), print 11

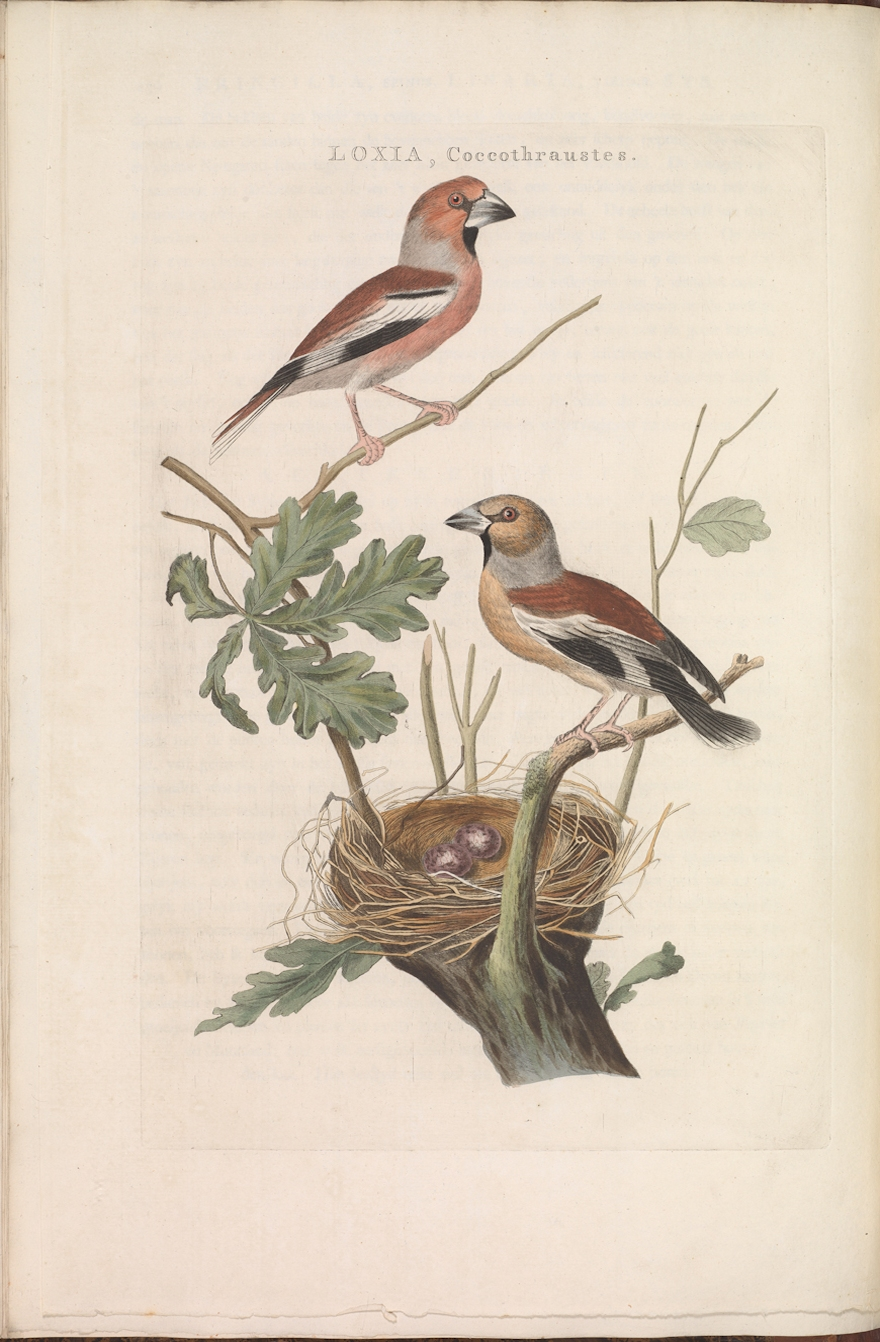
Coccothraustes coccothraustes (Hawfinch), print 71

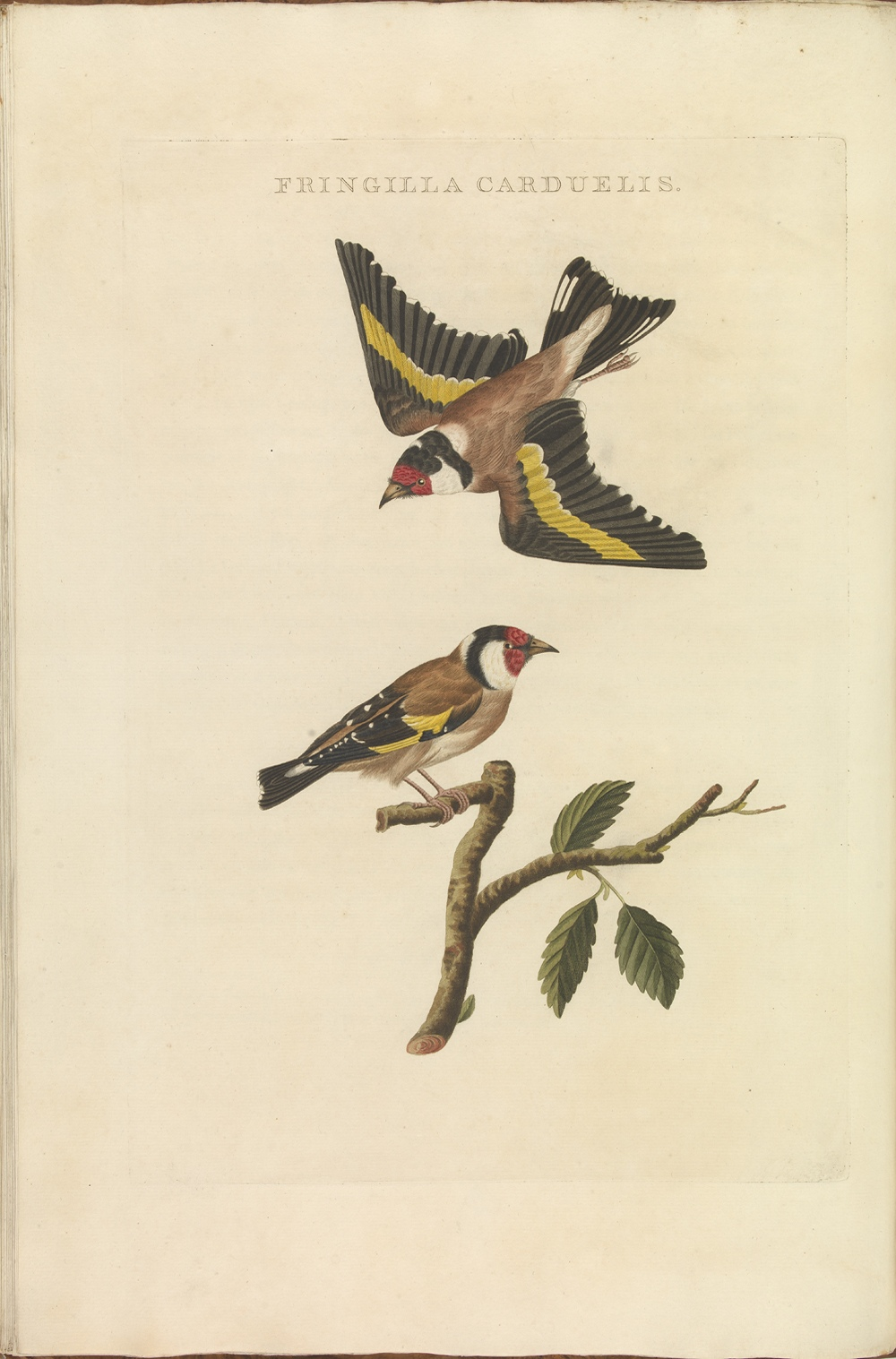
Fringilla carduelis (European goldfinch), print 168

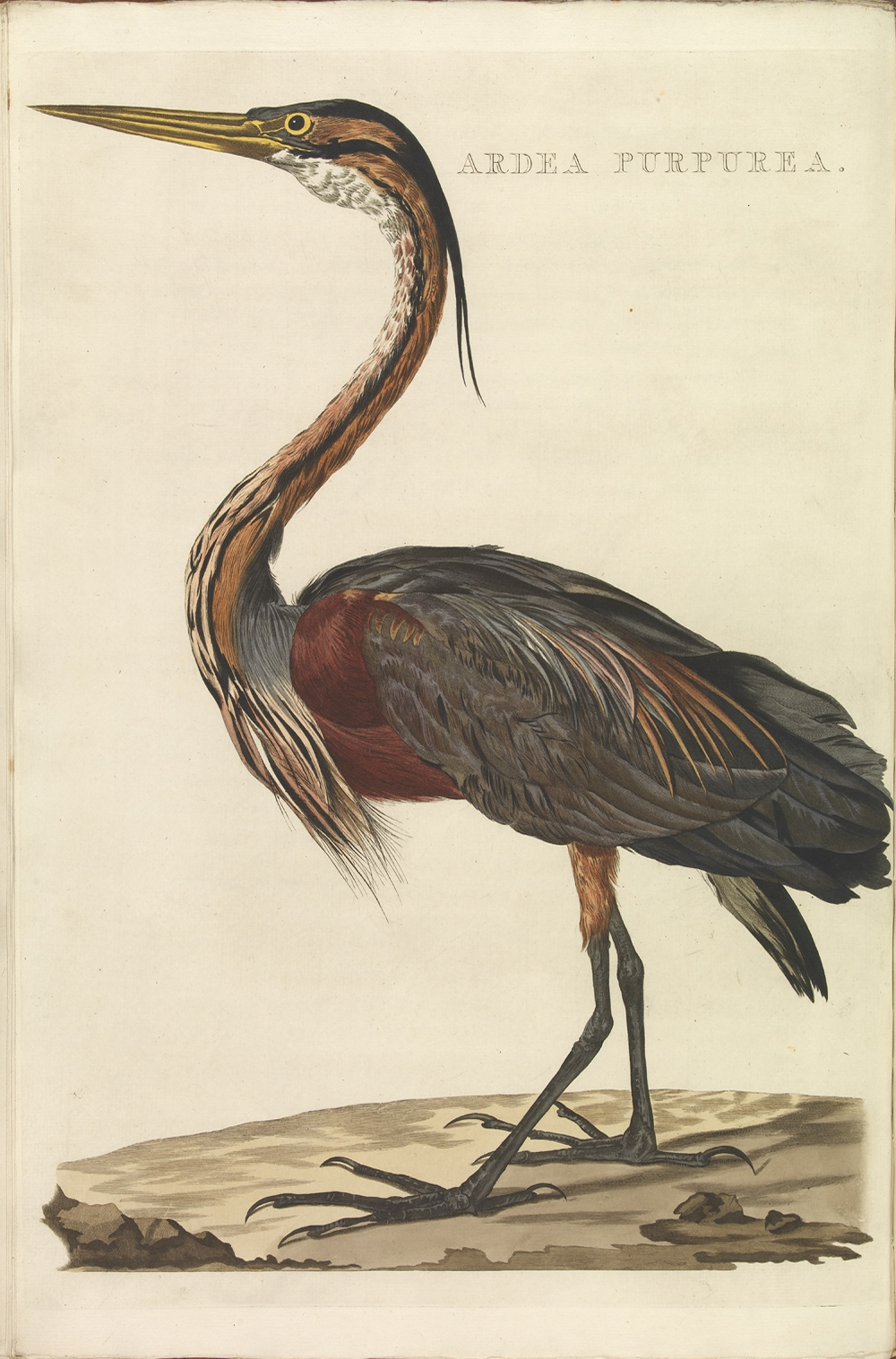
Ardea purpurea (Purple heron), print 180

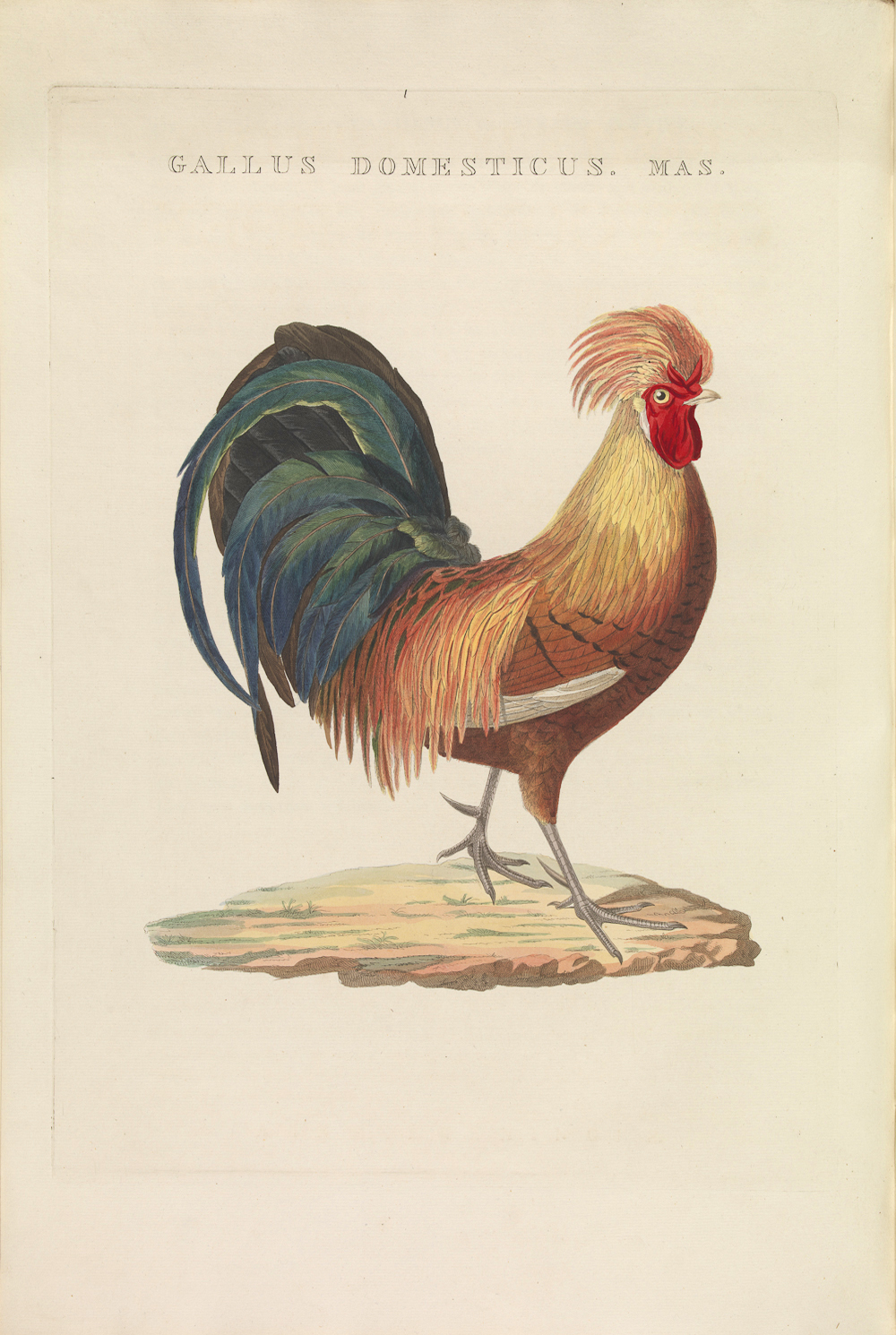
Gallus domesticus mas. (Rooster), print 240

== The makers ==
Cornelius Nozeman (1720 - 1786) was a Remonstrant vicar. He wrote the texts of Nederlandsche vogelen vol. 1 and a large part of vol. 2. After his death, his work was continued by Martinus Houttuyn (1720 - 1798), who was a physician and biologist. The last volume was put together by the publisher with the help of Coenraad Jacob Temminck (1778 - 1858).

The engravings were made by and under supervision of Christiaan Sepp (c. 1700 - 1775), and later by his son Jan Christiaan Sepp (1739 - 1811) and his grandson Jan Sepp (1778 - 1853).

The works were published by Jan Christiaan Sepp and son. The plates are not signed. It is not always clear who has drawn them.

== Reprint 2014 and digital edition ==
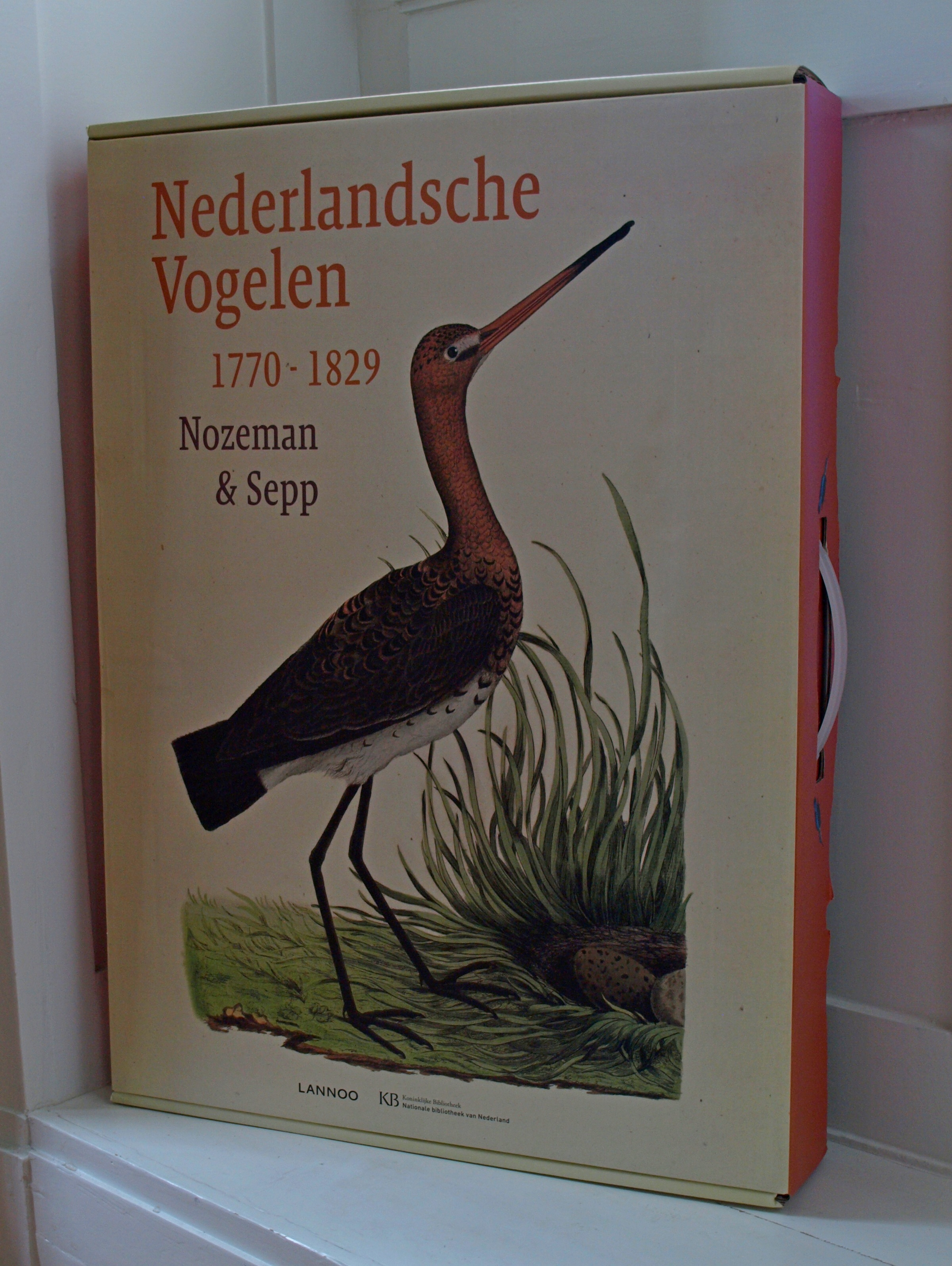
Nederlandsche Vogelen (reprint 2014, in the cassette)

In 2014 a reprint of Nederlandsche vogelen was published in a cooperation between Lannoo publishers and the Koninklijke Bibliotheek (KB, literally: Royal Library (of the Netherlands)). The 5 volumes were published in one giant book in the original size of 56 x 39,5 cm.

This reprint has an introduction by Marieke van Delft, Esther van Gelder and Alexander Raat. An index completes this book of suitcase-size with a weight of 11 kg. The complete set of 250 images on Wikimedia Commons were donated by the KB in 2015.
