= Martinus Houttuyn =

Dutch naturalist

Maarten Houttuyn
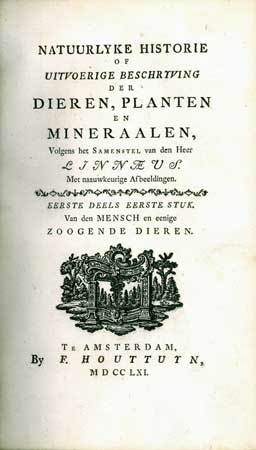
- Title page of the first volume of Natuurlijke Historie (1761)
- Born: 1720; Hoorn, Dutch Republic
- Died: 2 May 1798 (aged 77–78); Amsterdam, Netherlands
- Education: University of Leiden
- Scientific career
- Fields: Pteridophytes; Bryophytes; Spermatophytes
- Author abbrev. (botany): Houtt.

Signature
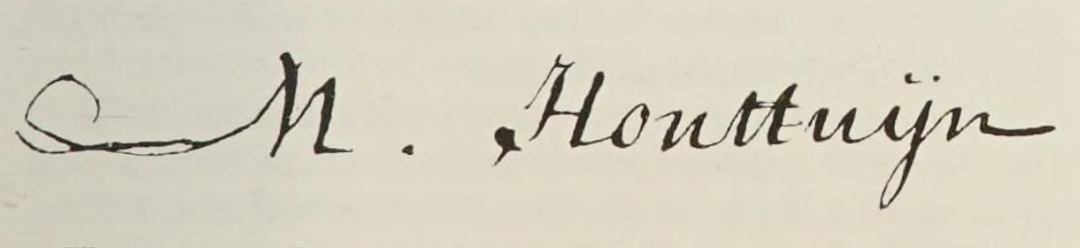

Maarten Houttuyn or Houttuijn (1720 – 2 May 1798; Latinised as Martinus Houttuyn) was a Dutch naturalist.

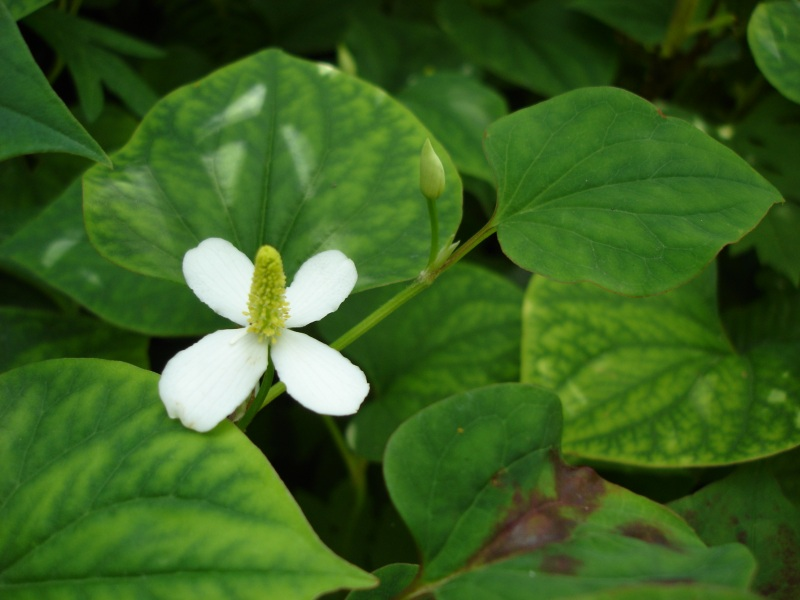
Houttuynia cordata

Houttuyn was born in Hoorn, studied medicine in Leiden and moved to Amsterdam in 1753. He published many books on natural history, e.g. Natuurlyke Historie of uitvoerige Beschryving der Dieren, Planten en Mineraalen, volgens het Samenstel van den Heer Linnaeus, in 37 volumes (1761-1773), following Carl Linnaeus' division into the animal kingdom, the plant kingdom, and the mineral kingdom. His areas of interest encompassed Pteridophytes, Bryophytes and Spermatophytes. He died in Amsterdam. In botanical nomenclature, the standard author abbreviation Houtt. is applied to plants described by him. He is commemorated by the genus Houttuynia, a member of the Saururaceae from China and Japan.

Martinus Houttuyn was the co-writer of the volumes 2, 3, 4 and 5 of Nederlandsche Vogelen. The first author was Cornelius Nozeman.
