= Leonard =

Leonard is a common English surname and a masculine given name.

The given name and surname originate from the Old High German Leonhard containing the prefix levon ("lion") from the Greek Λέων ("lion") through the Latin Leo, and the suffix hardu ("brave" or "hardy"). The name has come to mean "lion strength", "lion-strong", or "lion-hearted". Leonard was the name of a Saint in the Middle Ages period, known as the patron saint of prisoners.

Leonard is also an Irish origin surname, from the Gaelic O'Leannain also found as O'Leonard, but often was anglicised to just Leonard, consisting of the prefix O ("descendant of") and the suffix Leannan ("lover"). The oldest public records of the surname appear in 1272 in Huntingdonshire, England, and in 1479 in Ulm, Germany.

== Variations ==
The name has variants in other languages:

- Anard/Nardu/Lewnardu/Leunardu (Maltese)
- Leen, Leendert, Lenard (Dutch)
- Lehnertz, Lehnert (Luxembourgish)
- Len (English)
- Lénárd (Hungarian)
- Lenart (disambiguation) (Slovene)
- Linhart (Czech)
- Lennard, diminutive forms Lenny
- Lennart (Swedish, Estonian, Dutch)
- Lennert (German, Dutch)
- Lev (Ukrainian)
- Lenni (Finnish)
- Lenno (Groningen)
- Lenny (English)
- Leo (many languages)
- Leon (English, German, Dutch, Russian, Polish)
- Léon (French), León (Spanish)
- Léonard ([leɔnaʁ]; French)
- Leonard = "Renata" in Māori, Waitaha
- Leonardo (Italian, Spanish, and Portuguese)
- Leonardus (Dutch)
- Leonhard, Leonhardt (German)
- Leontxo (Basque)
- O'Leannáin
- O'Lionaird
- Leòmhannard (Scottish Gaelic)
- Linard (Rhaeto-Romanic / Swiss)
- Lionard (Scottish Gaelic)

== In other languages ==
- Armenian: Լեոնարդ (Leonard)
- Croatian: Leonard
- Czech: Leonard
- French: Léonard
- Georgian: ლეონარდ (Leonard)
- German: Leonard, Leonhard, Leonhardt, Lennart
- Greek: Λεονάρδος (Leonárdos)
- Hebrew: לֵב־אֲרִי (Lév-Ari)
- Hungarian: Lénárd, Leonárd
- Indonesian: Leonardo, Leonard, Leonardus, Lenno, Leo, Leon, Lenny
- Italian: Leonardo
- Latvian: Linards
- Lithuanian: Leonardas
- Māori: Renātā
- Maltese: Nardu
- Polish: Leonard
- Portuguese: Leonardo
- Romanian: Leonard
- Russian: Леонард (Leonard)
- Serbian: Леонард (Leonard)
- Spanish: Leonardo
- Swedish: Lennart
- Yiddish: לעאָנאַרד (Leonard)
- Ukrainian: Лев (Lev)

== Given name ==
Leonard
- Pronunciation: /ˈlɛnərd/ LEN-ərd
- Gender: Male

Origin
- Meaning: "lion strength"
- Region of origin: England

- Leonard Adleman (born 1945), American computer scientist
- Léonard Autié (1751–1820), French hairdresser
- Leonard Baskin (1922–2000), American artist
- Leonard Bernstein (1918–1990), American conductor and composer
- Leonard Burton (born 1964), American football player
- Leonard of Chios (died 1458), Catholic archbishop
- Leonard Cohen (1934–2016), Canadian singer-songwriter
- Leonard Cheshire (1917–1992), British philanthropist
- Leonard Decof (1924-2010), American lawyer
- Leonard Doroftei (born 1970), Romanian boxer
- Leonard Eilers (1898–1996), American storyteller, actor
- Leonhard Euler (1707–1783), Swiss mathematician
- Leonard Fairley (born 1951), American football player
- Leonard Fournette (born 1995), American football player
- Leonhard Fuchs (1501–1566), German physician and natural historian
- Leonard Hackney (1855–1938), Justice of the Indiana Supreme Court
- Leonard Harsh (1801–1866), American politician from Ohio
- Leonard Hoffmann, Baron Hoffmann (born 1934), British judge
- Leonard Humphries (born 1970), American football player
- Leonard Labatt (1838–1897), Swedish tenor
- Leonard Lance (born 1952), American politician
- Leonard Lansink (born 1956), German actor
- Leonard Lauder (1933–2025), American cosmetics industry executive
- Leonard "Lenny" Kravitz (born 1964), American singer and songwriter
- Leonard M. Kravitz (1931–1951), American soldier and Medal of Honor recipient
- Leonard Francis Lindoy (born 1937), Australian chemist
- Leonard Livingston (1920–1998), Australian cricketer
- Leonard Maltin (born 1950), American film critic and film historian
- Leonard Manning (1975–2000), New Zealand soldier and United Nations peacekeeper killed in East Timor
- Leonard Marchand (1933–2016), Canadian politician
- Leonard Mlodinow (born 1954), American physicist and writer
- Leonard Mudie (1883–1965), English actor
- Leonard Nimoy (1931–2015), American actor and film director
- Leonard of Noblac (died 559), Frankish nobleman
- Leonard Nolens (1947–2025), Belgian poet and diary writer
- Leonard Patrick, American mobster
- Leonard Peikoff (born 1933), Canadian philosopher
- Leonard Peltier (born 1944), American Activist
- Leonard Pitts (born 1957), American journalist
- Leonard of Port Maurice (1676–1751), Italian saint
- Leonard Roberts (born 1972), American actor
- Leonard "Lennie" Rosenbluth (1933–2022), American basketball player
- Leonard Rosenman (1924–2008), American composer
- Leonard Rossiter (1926–1984), English actor
- Leonard Silverman (1930–2015), New York politician and judge
- Leonard Slatkin (born 1944), American conductor
- Leonard Steinberg, Baron Steinberg (1936–2009), British businessman
- Leonard Stone (1923–2011), American actor
- Leonard Sumner, indigenous Canadian singer-songwriter
- Leonard Susskind (born 1940), American theoretical physicist
- Leonard Taylor (disambiguation), multiple people
- Leonard Thompson (footballer) (1901–1968), British football player
- Leonard Merlyn Wickramasuriya (1916–2002), Sri Lankan Sinhala army brigadier
- Leonard Woolf (1880-1969), English author, political theorist, and husband of Virginia Woolf
- Leonard Woolley (1880–1960), British archaeologist
- Leonard Wong, American military writer
- Leonard Wu, American actor, writer and producer

== Surname ==
Leonard
Origin
- Meaning: "lion-strong"; "lion-hearted"
- Region of origin: Old High German; Gaelic

=== A–F ===
- Ada Leonard (1915–1997), American bandleader
- Adam Leonard (singer-songwriter) (born 1969), English singer-songwriter
- Adna Wright Leonard (1874–1943), Methodist Bishop of Buffalo NY
- André-Joseph Léonard (born 1940), Archbishop of Mechelen-Brussels
- Andrew Leonard (journalist), American technology journalist
- Andy Leonard (1846–1903), baseball
- Benny Leonard (born Benjamin Leiner; "The Ghetto Wizard", 1896–1947), American world champion Hall of Fame lightweight boxer
- Bill Leonard (politician) (born 1947), American politician
- Bobby Leonard (1932–2021), American basketball coach
- Brad Leonard (born 1979), New Zealand cricketer
- Brendon Leonard (born 1985), rugby union
- Brian Leonard (born 1984), American football
- Buck Leonard (1907–1997), baseball
- Cecil Leonard (1946–2020), American football
- Charles H. Leonard (1822–1918), American Universalist minister, theologian, and academic
- Chuck Leonard (1937–2004), radio
- Conrad Leonard (1898–2003), pianist
- Courtney M. Leonard (born 1980), American artist and filmmaker
- Cynthia Leonard (1828–1908), suffragist
- Deane Leonard (born 1999), American football player
- Dennis Leonard (born 1951), baseball
- Dick Leonard (1930–2021), British politician
- Dutch Leonard (left-handed pitcher) (1892–1952, Hubert Benjamin Leonard), baseball
- Dutch Leonard (right-handed pitcher) (Emil John Leonard, 1909–1983), baseball
- Edwin Leonard (1823–1900), American Civil War Medal of Honor recipient
- Ego Leonard, anonymous Dutch sculptor, painter, guerrilla artist
- Elijah Leonard (1814–1891), Canadian politician
- Elizabeth Leonard (died 1992), American politician
- Elizabeth Weeks Leonard, American professor
- Elmore Leonard (1925–2013), American novelist
- Emery Clarence Leonard (1892–1968), American botanist
- Fessor Leonard (1953–1978), American basketball player
- Fred Churchill Leonard (1856–1921), American politician
- Frederick C. Leonard (1896–1960), American astronomer

=== G–L ===
- Gary Leonard (born 1967), basketball
- George Leonard (1923–2010), American author
- Glenn Leonard (born 1947), American musician
- Gloria Leonard (1940–2014), actress
- Graham Leonard (1921–2010), Anglican Bishop converted to Catholicism
- Gustav Leonhardt (1928–2012), Dutch musician, conductor, musicologist
- Harlan Leonard (1905–1983), American jazz musician
- Harry Ward Leonard (1861–1915), American inventor
- Herbert Léonard (1945–2025), French singer, entertainer and historian
- Herbert B. Leonard (1922–2006), American producer and writer
- Herman Leonard (1923–2010), photographer
- Hookey Leonard, Scottish professional footballer
- Hubert Léonard (1819–1890), Belgian violinist
- Hugh Leonard (1926–2009), Irish playwright
- Isabel Leonard (born 1982), American operatic mezzo-soprano
- J. Paul Leonard (1901–1995), American university president, educator
- J. Rich Leonard, American judge
- Jack E. Leonard (1910–1973), comedian
- Jacqueline Leonard (born 1965), Scottish actress
- James Leonard (disambiguation), several people
- Jason Leonard (born 1968), English rugby union player
- Jeffrey Leonard (born 1955), American baseball player
- Jerris Leonard (1931–2006), American politician
- Jim Leonard (disambiguation), several people
- Jimmy Leonard (1927–2022), Irish politician
- Joe Leonard (1932–2017), motorsports
- John J. Leonard, mayor of Bolingbrook, Illinois
- John Leonard (critic) (1939–2008), American critic, pen name Cyclops
- John Leonard (Gaelic footballer) (born 1976), Gaelic football goalkeeper
- John Leonard (poet) (born 1965), Australian poet
- Johnny Leonard (1903–1995), Australian rules football
- Joseph John Henry Leonard (1863–1929), Australian illustrator
- Joshua Leonard (born 1975), actor
- June Leonard (died 1994), American politician
- Justin Leonard (born 1972), American golfer
- Kawhi Leonard (born 1991), American basketball player
- Larry Leonard (1934–2002), American politician
- Lee Leonard (1929–2018), American TV personality
- Louise Wareham Leonard, American author

=== M–Z ===
- Manon Léonard (born 2001), French tennis player
- Margaret Burr Leonard (1942–2022), American civil rights activist and journalist
- Marion Leonard (1881–1956), actress
- Mark Leonard (footballer) (born 1962), association football
- Marshall Leonard (born 1980), soccer player
- Matthew Leonard (1929–1967), Medal of Honor recipient
- Meyers Leonard (born 1992), American basketball player
- Michael Leonard (disambiguation), several people
- Minnetta Sammis Leonard (1879 – 1960), American educator
- Miriam Leonard (born 1977), British professor of Greek literature
- Nelson J. Leonard (1916–2006), American organic and bioorganic chemist
- Patricia Leonard (1936–2010), English opera singer
- Patrick James Leonard (1847–1899), Medal of Honor recipient
- Patrick Leonard (born 1956), American songwriter
- Patrick Thomas Leonard (1828–1905), Indian Wars Medal of Honor recipient
- Paul Leonard (politician) (born 1943), American politician
- Paul Leonard (writer), UK author
- Philippe Léonard (born 1974), soccer
- Priscilla Leonard, pen name for Emily Perkins Bissell, an American social worker and activist
- Ranginui Parewahawaha Leonard (1872–1984), New Zealand weaver, farmer and kuia
- Rick Leonard (born 1996), American football
- Robert A. Leonard, American linguist known for his forensic work and former singer for Sha Na Na
- Robert Maynard Leonard (1869–1941), English journalist and editor
- Robert Sean Leonard (born 1969), actor
- Robert Z. Leonard (1889–1968), director
- Ronald Leonard, cellist
- Ryan Leonard (ice hockey) (born 2005), American ice hockey player
- Sarah Leonard (archer) (1862–1951), archery
- Scott Leonard (born 1965), American musician
- Shaquille Leonard (born 1995), American football
- Sheldon Leonard (1907–1997), American film and TV producer
- Silvio Leonard (born 1955), Cuban sprinter
- Sonny Leonard (1943–2021), American businessman
- Stan Leonard (1915–2005), Canadian golfer
- Stephen B. Leonard (1793–1876), American politician
- Steve Leonard (born 1972), English TV personality
- Sugar Ray Leonard (born 1956), American boxer
- Tasha Cobbs Leonard (born 1981), American gospel singer
- Terry Leonard (born 1940), American stunt performer and second-unit director
- Thomas Arthur Leonard (1864–1948), English pioneer of outdoor holidays
- Tom Leonard (Irish politician) (1924–2004)
- Tom Leonard (poet) (1944–2018), Scottish poet
- Tony Leonard (born 1947), Australian radio presenter
- Turney W. Leonard (1921–1944), Medal of Honor recipient
- Vincent Leonard (1908–1994), Bishop of Pittsburgh
- William E. Leonard (1836–1891), American Civil War Medal of Honor recipient
- William Ellery Leonard (1876–1944), American poet
- William J. Leonard (1927–2006), American football
- William Leonard (Scottish politician) (1887–1969)
- Wrexie Leonard (1867–1937), American astronomer
- Leonard (baseball), first name unknown, played in one Major League Baseball game in 1892

== Fictional characters ==
- Anatole Leonard, in the Robotech series
- Leonard (demon), in the Dictionnaire Infernal
- Léonard, title character in the Belgian comic of the same name
- Leonard W. "Lennie" Briscoe, a detective in Law & Order
- Private Leonard Church, from Red vs. Blue
- Leonard Hofstadter, in The Big Bang Theory
- Leonard von Lahnstein, character from German soap opera Forbidden Love
- Lenny Leonard, in The Simpsons
- Lockie Leonard, in children's novels by Tim Winton
- Leonard McCoy, in the Star Trek series
- Leonard Shelby, main character in the movie Memento
- Lennie Small, in the novel Of Mice and Men
- Leonard Snart, Captain Cold from The Flash comics and TV series
- Leonard, from the multimedia video game franchise Angry Birds

== See also ==
- Lenard, surname
- Leonardo
- Leonardo (given name)
- Saint Leonard (disambiguation)
- St Leonards (disambiguation)
