= Len (given name) =

Len is a masculine given name, usually a short form (hypocorism) of Leonard. It may refer to:

== Artists ==
Actors

- Len Cariou (born 1939), actor and stage director
- Len Carlson (1937–2006), voice actor
- Len Jones (born 1950/51), child actor
- Len Lesser (1922–2011), actor and comedian
- Len Maxwell (1930–2008), voice actor and broadcaster

Filmmakers

- Len Blum (born 1951), screenwriter, producer, and composer
- Len Harris (1916–1955), cinematographer
- Len Janson, screenwriter and director
- Len Wiseman (born 1973), screenwriter, producer, and director

Musicians

- Len Arran (born 1961), composer
- Len Barry (1942–2020), singer, songwriter and record producer
- Len Garry (1942–2026), English musician
- Len Graham (born 1944), singer

Writers

- Len Brown (born 1941), comic book writer
- Len Deighton (born 1929), novelist
- Len Peterson (1917–2008), playwright, screenwriter, and novelist
- Len Roberts (1947–2007), poet
- Len Wein (1948–2017), comic book writer

Other

- Len Cabral (born 1948), storyteller
- Len Goodman (1944–2023), ballroom dancer, dance judge, and coach
- Len Fox (writer) (1905–2004), writer and painter
- Len Lye (1901–1980), sculptor and experimental filmmaker
- Len Reynolds (1897–1939), Australian illustrator
- Len Steckler (1928–2016), photographer, illustrator, and filmmaker

== Athletes ==
Baseball

- Len Barker (born 1955)
- Len Dondero (1903-1999)
- Len Gabrielson (1915–2000), father of the below
- Len Gabrielson (born 1940), son of the above
- Len Koenecke (1904-1935), was killed while trying to hijack an airplane
- Len Lovett (1852-1922)
- Len Okrie (1923-2018)
- Len Rice (1918-1992)
- Len Stockwell (1859-1905)

Basketball

- Len Bias (1963-1986)
- Len Chappell (1941-2018)
- Len Elmore (born 1952), also a sportscaster and lawyer

Cricket

- Len Brown (1910-1983)
- Len Coldwell (1933-1996)
- Len Harris (1934-2006)
- Len Hutton (1916-1990)
- Len Pascoe (born 1950)

Football

- Len Andrews (1888-1969)
- Len Armitage (1899-1972)
- Len Astill (1916-1990)
- Len Attley (1910–1979),
- Len Browning (1928-2008)
- Len Davies (1899-1945)
- Len Evans (1903–1977)
- Len Graham (1925-2007)
- Len Hodges (1920-1959)
- Len Jones (1913-1998)
- Len Phillips (1922–2011)
- Len Shackleton (1922-2000), known as the "Clown Prince of Football"
- Len Small (1920-2009)
- Len Stansbridge (1919-1986)
- Len White (1930-1994)

Football, Australian Rules

- Len Brown (1910-1983)
- Len Dockett (1920–2008)
- Len Harris (1924-1995)
- Len Peterson (born 1946)
- Len Phillips (1890-1968)
- Len Phillips (1891-1978)
- Len Roberts (1880-1949)
- Len White (1922-2010)

Football, Gridiron

- Len Barnum (1912-1998)
- Len Dawson (1935-2022)
- Len Dugan (1910–1967)
- Len Eshmont (1917-1957)
- Len Ford (1926-1972), NFL hall of fame inductee
- Len Grant (1906-1938)
- Len Hauss (1942-2021)
- Len Rohde (1938-2017)
- Len St. Jean (born 1941)
- Len Supulski (1920-1943)
- Len Szafaryn (1928-1990)
- Len Teeuws (1927-2006)
- Len Walterscheid (born 1954)
- Len Younce (1917-2000)

Ice Hockey

- Len Ceglarski (1926-2017)
- Len Lunde (1936-2010)
- Len Wharton (1927-2007)

Racing

- Len Ormsby (1890-1983)
- Len Sutton (1925-2006)
- Len Zengel (1887-1963)

Multiple

- Len Casanova (1905-2002), baseball and gridiron football
- Len Hill (1941-2007), cricket, golf, football, and tennis
- Len Levy (1921–1999), gridiron football and wrestling

Other

- Len Casey (born 1953), rugby footballer and coach
- Len Denton (born 1958), wrestler
- Len Harvey (1907-1976), boxer, International Boxing Hall of Fame inductee
- Len Hutton (1908-1976), long and triple jumper
- Len Väljas (born 1988), skier

== Business ==
- Len Amato, President of HBO films
- Len McCluskey (born 1950), trade unionist
- Len Morgan (1922-2005), aviator, writer, publisher, entrepreneur, photogrammetrist, and investor
- Len Tuit (1911–1976), transportation and tourism pioneer
- Len White (1897-1955), trade union leader

== Math and science ==
- Len Cook (born 1949), statistician
- Len Doyal, medical ethicist
- Len A. Pennacchio, biologist
- Len Sassaman (1980-2011), technologist

== Politicians ==
Australia

- Len Harris (born 1943), politician
- Len Keogh (1931-2007), politician
- Len King (1925–2011), politician, lawyer, and judge
- Len Reynolds (1923-1980), politician

Canada

- Len Fox (1943-2018), businessman and politician
- Len Hopkins (1930-2007), politician
- Len Webber (born 1960), politician

New Zealand

- Len Brown (born 1956), mayor

USA

- Len E. Blaylock (1918–2012), farmer, educator, small businessman, and politician
- Len DiSesa, politician
- Len Lacy (1900-1998), businessman and politician
- Len Small (1862-1936), politician

== Other ==
- Len Beadell (1923–1995), surveyor, road builder, bushman, artist, and author
- Len Berman (born 1947), sportscaster and journalist
- Len G. Broughton (1865-1936), doctor and minister
- Len Evans (1930–2006), wine columnist
- Len Kasper, sportscaster

== Fictional characters ==
- Major Len Creighton, a character from Stephen King's The Stand
- Len Kagamine, a Vocaloid from Vocaloid 2
- Len Reynolds, in the British soap opera Emmerdale
- Len, the feature character from the manga Video Girl Len
- Len (Tsukihime), from the visual novel Tsukihime by TYPE-MOON
- Bishop Leonard Brennan, a character in the sitcom Father Ted, who is sometimes referred to as "Len".
- Len, a character in the series Ruby Gloom
