= Leonardus (name) =

Leonardus is a Latinized version of the Germanic masculine name Leonard. Leonardus has been a relatively common birth name in the Netherlands, though most people use(d) a short form in daily life, like Leen, Leendert, Lennaert, Lennard, Lennart, Lennert, Lennie, Leo, Leon, Leonard and Lon.

Latinized name

- Sanctus Leonardus (died 559 AD), Frankish noble, abbot and Christian saint
- Leonardus Achates (Leonhard Agtstein; f.1472–1491), Swiss printer in Italy
- Leonardus Bruni Aretinus (Leonardi Bruni; c.1370–1444), Italian humanist, historian and statesman
- Leonardus Lessius (Lenaert Leijs; 1554–1623), Flemish Jesuit theologian
- Leonardus Roselli (died 1606), Italian bishop
- Leonardus Vincius (1452–1519), Leonardo da Vinci

Birth name

- Leonardus Petrus "Leo" Beukeboom (1943–2017), Dutch sign painter and lettering artist
- Leonardus L.J. "Leo" de Bever (1930–2015), Dutch architect
- Leonardus Bramer (1596–1674), Dutch painter
- Leonardus Dobbelaar (1942–2008), Dutch bishop in Ethiopia
- Leonardus "Léon" Dolmans (born 1945), Belgian footballer
- Petrus Leonardus "Leo" Ehlen (1953–2016), Dutch footballer
- Leonardus J.P.M. "Léon" Frissen (born 1950), Dutch Queen's Commissioner of Limburg
- Leonardus Eustachius "Leen" Jansen (1930–2014), Dutch boxer
- Leonardus F.E. "Leon" Kantelberg (born 1978), Dutch footballer
- Leonardus Gerardus Kortenhorst (1886–1963), Dutch President of the House of Representatives
- Leonardus van der Laan (1864–1942), Dutch architect
- Leonardus Antonius Lightenvelt (1795–1873), Dutch Minister of Justice and Foreign Affairs
- Jan Leonardus "Lennie" Louw (born 1959), South African-born Namibian cricketer
- Leonardus Benjamin Moerdani (1932–2004), Indonesian general and Minister of Defense
- Leonardus Nardus (1868–1955), Dutch fencer
- Leonardus Offerhaus (1699–1779), German-born Dutch librarian and university president
- Leonardus J.H. “Leo” Passage (1936–2011), Dutch-born American hairstylist, educator, innovator and philanthropist
- Leonardus P.P. "Lon" Pennock (1945–2020), Dutch sculptor, monumental artist and photographer
- Leonardus Syttin (1892–?), Lithuanian sport shooter
- Leonardus Cornelius van der Valck (1769–1845), Dutch diplomat and mysterious count in Germany
- Leonardus Q.M. "Leo" van Vliet (born 1955), Dutch road racing cyclist
- Leonardus van der Voort (1762–1809), Dutch politician of the Batavian Republic

== See also ==
- Leonardus, fossil mammalian genus
- Leonardo (given name)
