= Lenney =

Lenney is a surname. Notable people with the surname include:

- Dinah Lenney (born 1956), American actress and writer
- Ralph Lenney (1895–1971), English footballer
- Will Lenney (born 1996), English YouTuber

== See also ==
- Lenny (given name)
- Linney
