= Elizabeth Leonard =

Elizabeth Leonard may refer to:

- Elizabeth Leonard (politician), American politician from Connecticut
- Elizabeth D. Leonard (born 1948), American historian
- Elizabeth Weeks Leonard, American lawyer and academic
- Elizabeth A. Leonard, Republican candidate in the 1992 Rhode Island gubernatorial election

== See also ==
- Elizabeth Leonhardt, chief nurse of the U.S. Navy Nurse Corps
