= Beukeboom =

Beukeboom (Dutch for beech tree, corr. German: Buchbaum, Buchenbaum) is a surname. Notable people with the surname include:

- Brett Beukeboom (born 1990), Canadian rugby union player
- Dion Beukeboom (born 1989), Dutch cyclist
- Jeff Beukeboom (born 1965), Canadian ice hockey player and coach
- Leo Beukeboom (1943–2017), Dutch signpainter and lettering artist
- Matt Beukeboom (born 1997), Canadian rugby union player
- Tyson Beukeboom (born 1991), Canadian rugby union player

== See also ==
- Beucke
- Beukes
- Beuck
- Beuk
