= Lenny (given name) =

Lenny or Lennie is a given name. Notable people with the name include:

It is a historical hypocoristic of names such as Leonard, Leon, Leander, Leonce, Lenard, and occasionally for Alexander as well.

== People ==
=== In sports ===
- Leonard Lenny Dykstra (born 1963), American former Major League Baseball player
- Lenny Fernandes Coelho (born 1988), Brazilian footballer
- Lenny Druyts (born 1997), Belgian professional racing cycling
- Leonard Lennie Friedman (born 1976), American former National Football League player
- Lenny Hayes (born 1980), former Australian rules footballer
- Elaine Lenny Holohan (born 1985), Irish camogie player
- Leonid Lenny Krayzelburg (born 1975), Ukrainian-born American swimmer, four-time Olympic gold medalist
- Jan Leonardus Lennie Louw (born 1959), South African-born Namibian cricketer
- Lenny Permana (born 1975), female badminton player from Australia
- Lenny Randle (1949–2024), American baseball player
- Lenny Rodrigues, Indian footballer playing for FC Goa
- Leonard Lennie Rosenbluth (1933–2022), American former college basketball and National Basketball Association player
- Ilenia Lenny Sims (born 2002), English-Italian cricketer
- Leonard Lenny Wilkens (1937–2025), American former National Basketball Association player and coach, member of several Halls of Fame as player and coach
- Lennie Waite (born 1986), British female track and field athlete

=== In music ===
- Lenny (singer) (born 1993), Czech singer, songwriter, composer, lyricist, and pianist
- Leonard Lenny Fontana (active from 1985), American house music DJ
- Leonard Lennie Hayton (1908–1971), American composer and conductor
- Lenny Kaye (born 1946), American musician, composer and writer, guitarist of Patti Smith Group
- Leonard Lenny Kravitz (born 1964), American rock/hard rock singer, songwriter, producer and guitarist
- Helena Lenny Kuhr (born 1950), Dutch singer-songwriter
- Leonard Lenny Waronker (born 1941), American record label executive and producer
- Lenny Welch (1938–2025), American pop singer

=== In film and television ===
- Lenny Clarke (born 1953), actor, writer, and producer
- Lenworth Lenny Henry (born 1958), British stand-up comedian, actor, writer and television presenter
- Lennie James (born 1965), British actor
- Leonard Alfred Schneider Lenny Bruce (1925–1966), an American stand-up comedian, social critic, and satirist
- Lenny Trčková (born 1978), Czech radio presenter, TV presenter and model

=== Other ===
- Lennie Copeland (1881–1951), American mathematician and professor
- Leonard DiMaria (born 1941), New York mobster
- Leuntje Lenny Geluk-Poortvliet (born 1943), Dutch politician
- Lennie Goodings (born 1953), Canadian-born publisher active in the United Kingdom
- Hugh Leonard Lenny Murphy (1952–1982), psychopathic killer from Northern Ireland, member of the paramilitary Ulster Volunteer Force
- Lenny Montana (1926–1992), professional wrestler and mob enforcer turned film actor
- Lenny Patrick, Chicagoan mobster
- Lenny Ureña Valerio (born 1977), Puerto Rican scholar of colonial and Polish history

== Fictional characters ==
- Lenny (bot), a chat bot designed to disrupt telemarketer calls
- Lenny Buskers, a character in the television series Legion
- Lennie Small, principal character in the John Steinbeck novel, Of Mice and Men
- Lenny Kosnowski, in the television series, Laverne and Shirley
- Lenny Leonard, a recurring character in the television series, The Simpsons
- Lenny, in the animated film, Toy Story
- Lenny Feder, in the films Grown Ups and Grown Ups 2
- Lenny Parker, in the television series, Mona the Vampire
- Lenny, in the animated film, Shark Tale
- Lenny, a neopet
- Leni Loud, in the animated series, The Loud House
- Lennie Briscoe, on the television series, Law and Order
- Lenny Summers, in the video game Red Dead Redemption 2
- Lenny, a recurring character in Fanboy & Chum Chum
- Lenny, a gorilla from Jim Henson's Animal Show
- Lenny Fiasco, the true identity of the Batman villain known as the Eraser.

== See also ==
- Lenny the Lion (disambiguation)
