= Leonard Peterson =

Leonard Peterson may refer to:

- Leonard Peterson (gymnast), Swedish gymnast
- Leonard Peterson (sound engineer), American sound engineer
- Len Peterson, Canadian playwright, screenwriter and novelist
- Len Peterson (footballer), Australian rules footballer
