= Walter L. Arnstein =

American historian (1930–2019)

Walter Leonard Arnstein (14 May 1930 – 6 October 2019) was a German-born American historian who was Professor of History Emeritus and Jubilee Professor of the Liberal Arts and Sciences Emeritus at the University of Illinois Urbana-Champaign from 1968–98. He specialised in the history of Victorian Britain.

Arnstein was born in Stuttgart into a Jewish family. They immigrated to the United States in 1939 and became U.S. citizens in 1942. His father, Richard, was a shipping clerk. Arnstein adopted the middle name "Leonard" in honor of American conductor Leonard Bernstein.

Arnstein graduated magna cum laude from the City College of New York in 1951 and earned a Master of Arts from Columbia University in 1954. He was a Fulbright Scholar at the University of London and in 1961 earned his doctorate in History at Northwestern University in 1961.

From 1951–53, he served in the U.S. Army during the Korean War as an assistant battalion supply sergeant in an anti-aircraft battalion.

In 2001, he received a festschrift in his honor, titled Splendidly Victorian, and edited by Michael Shirley and Todd Larson.

He married Charlotte Sutphen in 1952. He died in 2019 in Urbana.

== Selected publications ==
- The Bradlaugh Case: A Study in Late Victorian Opinion and Politics (1965, 1984)
- Britain, Yesterday and Today: 1830 to the Present (1966, 2018)
- Queen Victoria (2003)
