= Lon =

Lon or LON may refer to:

== People ==
- Lon (name), a list of people with the given name, nickname or surname
- Lon (photographer), pseudonym of Alonzo Hanagan, also known as "Lon of New York"

== Fictional characters ==
- Lon Cohen, in the Nero Wolfe novels by Rex Stout
- Lon Suder, on the television series Star Trek: Voyager

== Science and technology ==
- Launch on Need, a Space Shuttle rescue mission which would have been mounted to rescue the crew of a Space Shuttle if needed
- Local Operating Network, a networking platform by Echelon Corporation
- Local oxidation nanolithography, a nanofabrication technique
- Lon (butterfly), a genus of butterflies
- Lon protease family, in molecular biology
- Longitude (lon.), a geographic coordinate

== Other uses ==
- League of Nations, the predecessor of the United Nations
- LON, IATA airport code for airports of London
- lon, ISO 639-3 code for the Malawi Lomwe language, spoken in southeastern Malawi

== See also ==
- Lons, a French commune
- 37608 Löns, an asteroid
