= Scalzo =

Scalzo is a surname of Italian origin that means "barefoot." It has also been used as an insult for a poor person, specifically someone believed to be too poor to own shoes.

== Notable people with the surname Scalzo ==
- Christopher R. Scalzo (born 1963), American politician and businessman
- Giovanni Scalzo (born 1959), Italian fencer
- Mario Scalzo (born 1984), Canadian ice hockey player
- Petey Scalzo (1917-1993), American boxer
- Tony Scalzo (born 1964), American rock musician and songwriter

== See also ==
- Vincent LoScalzo, former boss of the Trafficante crime family in Florida
- Scelzo
