= Leenders =

Leenders is a Dutch patronymic surname, derived from the given name Leendert (a Dutch version of "Leonard"). Among variant forms are Leendertse and Lenders In English (of Norman origin) and Irish, it means habitational name from Norman French de Londres ‘of London’, Gaelicized in Ireland as de Londras. Notable people with the surname include:

- Claudia Leenders (born 1994), Dutch slalom canoeist
- Henk Leenders (born 1950), Dutch Labour Party politician
- Herman Leenders (born 1960), Flemish writer and poet
- Toon Leenders (born 1986), Dutch handball player

Lenders

- John Lenders (born 1958), Australian (Victoria) politician
- Rea Lenders (born 1980), Dutch trampoline gymnast
- Jozef Lenders (born 1957) Dutch filmmaker and screenwriter
