= Len Brown (disambiguation) =

Len Brown (born 1956) is a New Zealand politician and former Mayor of Auckland.

Len Brown, Leonard Brown or Lennox Brown may also refer to:

- Len Brown (comics) (1941–2026), American writer, editor and radio personality
- Len Brown (cricketer) (1910–1983), South African cricketer
- Len Brown (footballer) (1910–1983), Australian footballer
- Lenny Brown (born 1975), American basketball player
