= Connecticut's 111th House of Representatives district =

House of Representatives district

Connecticut's 111th State House of Representatives district
Representative
| Aimee Berger-Girvalo; D |

Connecticut's 111th House of Representatives district elects one member of the Connecticut House of Representatives. It encompasses parts of Ridgefield and has been represented by Democrat Aimee Berger-Girvalo since 2021.

== List of representatives ==
List of representatives from Connecticut's 111th State House district
| Representative | Party | Years | District home | Note |
|---|---|---|---|---|
| Bruce L. Morris | Democratic | 1967–1973 | New Haven | Redistricted to the 94th District |
| Herbert V. Camp | Republican | 1973–1977 | Ridgefield | Redistricted from the 163rd District |
| Elizabeth Leonard | Republican | 1977–1981 | Ridgefield | Later served as First Selectman of Ridgefield, Connecticut |
| Martha Rothman | Republican | 1982–1985 | Ridgefield | Resigned from the State House in 1985 to move to California |
| Jane Jansen | Republican | 1985–1987 | Ridgefield | |
| Barbara Ireland | Democratic | 1987–1995 | Ridgefield | |
| Christopher R. Scalzo | Republican | 1995–1999 | Ridgefield | Ran unsuccessfully for Comptroller in 1998 |
| John H. Frey | Republican | 1999–2021 | Ridgefield | |
| Aimee Berger-Girvalo | Democratic | 2021–present | Ridgefield | |

== Recent elections ==
=== 2020 ===
2020 Connecticut State House of Representatives election, District 111
| Party | Candidate | Votes | % |
|---|---|---|---|
| Democratic | Aimee Berger-Girvalo | 8,044 | 52.41 |
| Republican | Bob Hebert | 6,844 | 44.59 |
| Independent Party | Bob Hebert | 461 | 3.00 |
| Total votes | | 15,349 | 100.00 |
| Democratic gain from Republican | | | |

=== 2018 ===
2018 Connecticut House of Representatives election, District 111
| Party | Candidate | Votes | % |
|---|---|---|---|
| Republican | John H. Frey (Incumbent) | 6,326 | 51.8 |
| Democratic | Aimee Berger-Givalo | 5,888 | 48.2 |
| Total votes | | 12,214 | 100.00 |
| Republican hold | | | |

=== 2016 ===
2016 Connecticut House of Representatives election, District 111
| Party | Candidate | Votes | % |
|---|---|---|---|
| Republican | John H. Frey (Incumbent) | 8,435 | 62.83 |
| Democratic | Joe Dowdell | 4,991 | 37.17 |
| Total votes | | 13,426 | 100.00 |
| Republican hold | | | |

=== 2014 ===
2014 Connecticut House of Representatives election, District 111
| Party | Candidate | Votes | % |
|---|---|---|---|
| Republican | John H. Frey (Incumbent) | 6,511 | 74.3 |
| Democratic | Sky Cole | 2,257 | 25.7 |
| Total votes | | 8,768 | 100.00 |
| Republican hold | | | |

=== 2012 ===
2012 Connecticut House of Representatives election, District 111
| Party | Candidate | Votes | % |
|---|---|---|---|
| Republican | John H. Frey (Incumbent) | 8,142 | 63 |
| Democratic | Jeff Bonistalli | 4,791 | 37 |
| Total votes | | 12,933 | 100.00 |
| Republican hold | | | |
