= Beukes =

Beukes is a surname. Notable people with the surname include:

- Carl Beukes (born 1976), South African actor
- Dricky Beukes (1918–1999), South African novelist
- Hans Beukes, Namibian writer
- Herbert Beukes, South African diplomat
- Hermanus Beukes (1913–2004), South African politician
- Jonathan Beukes (born 1979), South African cricket player
- Lauren Beukes (born 1976), South African novelist
- Priscilla Beukes, Namibian politician
- Roelf Beukes, South African military commander
