= Leonardo (given name) =

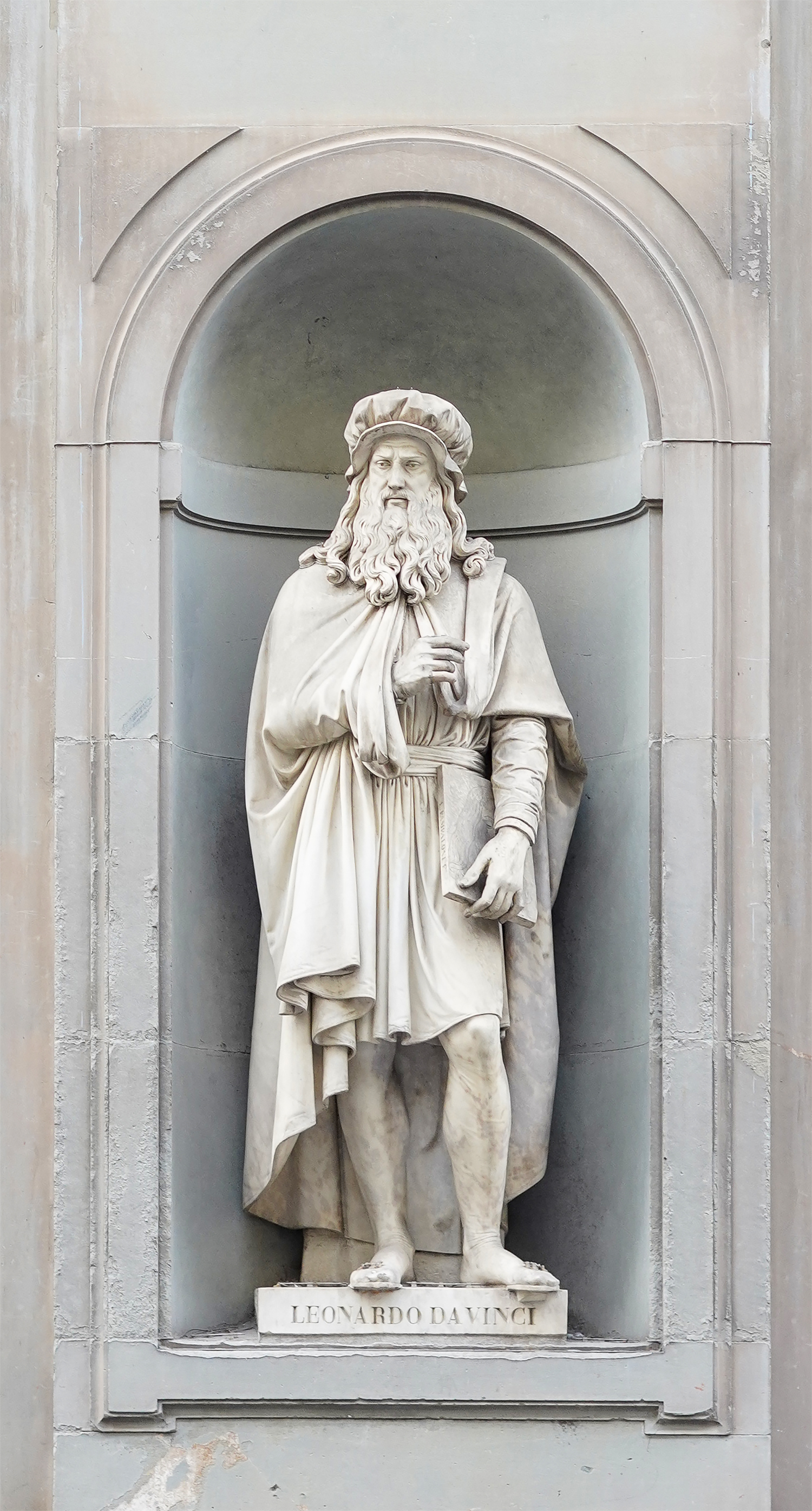
- Leonardo da Vinci
- Pronunciation: Italian: [leoˈnardo]
- Gender: Male

Origin
- Origin: Italian, Spanish, Portuguese
- Meaning: strong as a lion

Leonardo is a masculine given name, the Italian, Spanish, and Portuguese equivalent of the English, German, and Dutch name, Leonard.

Notable people with the name include:

== Artists ==
- Leonardo da Vinci (1452–1519), Italian Renaissance scientist, inventor, engineer, sculptor, and painter
- Leonardo Brício (born 1963), Brazilian actor and theatre director
- Leonardo Schulz Cardoso (born 1992), Brazilian singer
- Emival Eterno da Costa (born 1963), Brazilian singer known as Leonardo
- Leonardo de Mango (1843–1930), Italian-born Turkish painter
- Leonardo DiCaprio (born 1974), American actor
- Leonardo Miggiorin (born 1982), Brazilian actor
- Leonardo Pieraccioni (born 1965), Italian actor and director
- Leonardo Vieira (born 1968), Brazilian actor

== Athletes ==
- Leonardo Araújo (born 1969), usually known as Leonardo, Brazilian World Cup-winning footballer, and former sporting director of Paris Saint Germain
- Leonardo Campana (born 2000), Ecuadorian footballer
- Leonardo Fioravanti (surfer) (born 1997), Italian surfer
- Leonardo Balerdi (born 1999), Argentine footballer
- Leonardo Lourenço Bastos (born 1975), Brazilian footballer
- Leonardo Bittencourt (born 1993), German footballer
- Leonardo Bonucci (born 1987), Italian footballer
- Leonardo Candi (born 1997), Italian basketball player
- Leonardo Cardona (born 1971), Colombian road cyclist
- Leonardo Emilio Comici (1901–1940), Italian mountain climber
- Leonardo David (1960–1985), Italian alpine skier
- Leonardo André Pimenta Faria (born 1982), Brazilian footballer
- Leonardo de Jesus Geraldo (born 1985), Brazilian footballer
- Leonardo Gonçalves (born 1996), Brazilian judoka
- Leonardo Renan Simões de Lacerda (born 1988), also known as Léo, Brazilian football defender
- Leonardo Lopes (born 1998), Portuguese footballer
- Leonardo Meindl (born 1993), Brazilian basketball forward
- Leonardo José Aparecido Moura (born 1986), Brazilian footballer of Shakhtar Donetsk
- Leonardo Narváez (born 1980), Colombian track cyclist
- Leonardo Rodriguez Pereira (born 1986), Brazilian footballer of Jeonbuk Hyundai Motors
- Leonardo Santiago (born 1983), Brazilian footballer
- Leonardo Ferreira da Silva (born 1980), Brazilian footballer of Chiangrai United
- Leonardo dos Santos Silva (born 1976), Brazilian footballer of FC Dordrecht (also known as Leonardo II)
- José Leonardo Ribeiro da Silva (born 1988), usually known as Leonardo, Brazilian footballer
- Leonardo Sottani (born 1973), Italian water polo player
- Leonardo Nascimento Lopes de Souza (born 1997), Brazilian footballer
- Leonardo Spinazzola (born 1993), Italian footballer
- Leonardo Suárez (born 1996), Argentine footballer
- Leonardo Ulloa (born 1986), Argentine footballer
- Leonardo Zappavigna (born 1987), Australian boxer

== Other ==
- Leonardo Agostini (1593–1676), Italian antiquary
- Leonardo Aguilar (born 1999), Mexican singer
- Leonardo Bianchi (1848–1927), Italian neurologist
- Leonardo Bruni (c. 1370–1444), humanist, historian and chancellor of Florence
- Leonardo Farkas (born 1967), Chilean businessman
- Leonardo Fibonacci (c. 1170 – c. 1250), Italian mathematician
- Leonardo Grandini (born 2002), Brazilian politician
- Leonardo León (born 1952), Chilean historian
- Leonardo López Luján (born 1964), Mexican archaeologist
- Leonardo López Pérez (born 2001), Mexican professional gamer, better known as MkLeo
- Leonardo Torres Quevedo (1852–1936), Spanish civil engineer, mathematician and inventor

== Fictional characters ==
- Leonardo (Teenage Mutant Ninja Turtles), the leader of the four Turtles
- Leonardo Acropolis, painter in the Money episode of the BBC sitcom Blackadder
- Leonardo Leonardo, on the short-lived animated series, Clerks: The Animated Series
- Leonardo Vetra, in Dan Brown's novel Angels and Demons
- Leonardo Watch, in the manga series Blood Blockade Battlefront

== See also ==
- Lenny (disambiguation)
- Leonard (disambiguation)
- Leo (disambiguation)
- Leon (disambiguation)
