= Barbara Ireland =

American politician

Member of the Connecticut House of Representatives from the 111th district
- In office 1987–1995
- Preceded by: Jane Jansen
- Succeeded by: Christopher R. Scalzo

Personal details
- Party: Democratic

Barbara M. Ireland is an American politician who served in the Connecticut House of Representatives from 1987 to 1995, representing the 111th district as a Democrat.
