= Leonard Taylor =

Leonard Taylor or Lenny Taylor may refer to:

- Lenny Taylor (football coach), Jamaican soccer coach
- Lenny Taylor (American football) (born 1961), American football player
- Leonard Campbell Taylor (1874–1969), British painter
- Leonard "Len" Taylor (born 1952), Canadian politician
- Leonard Taylor (basketball) (born 1966), American basketball player
- Leonard Taylor (football manager), American soccer coach
- Leonard Taylor III (born 2002), American football player
