= Lennard =

Lennard may refer to:

- Lennard Freeman (born 1995), American basketball player in the Israeli Basketball Premier League
- Lennard Pearce (1915–1984), English actor
- Lennard Tuchscherer (born 1999), German slalom canoeist
- Dave Lennard (born 1944), English footballer
- Henry Lennard (16th–17th century), English baron and politician
- John Lennard (born 1964), Professor of Literature at the University of the West Indies, Jamaica
- Sampson Lennard (16th–17th century), English Member of Parliament
- John Lennard-Jones British theoretical physicist
- Lennard baronets, either of two extinct baronetcies

== See also ==
- Lenard
- Leonard
