= Scelzo =

Scelzo is an Italian surname. Notable people with the surname include:

- Filippo Scelzo (1900–1980), Italian actor
- Juan Martín Scelzo (born 2002), Argentine rugby union player
- Martín Scelzo (born 1976), Argentine retired rugby union player

== See also ==
- Scalzo
