= John H. Frey =

American politician

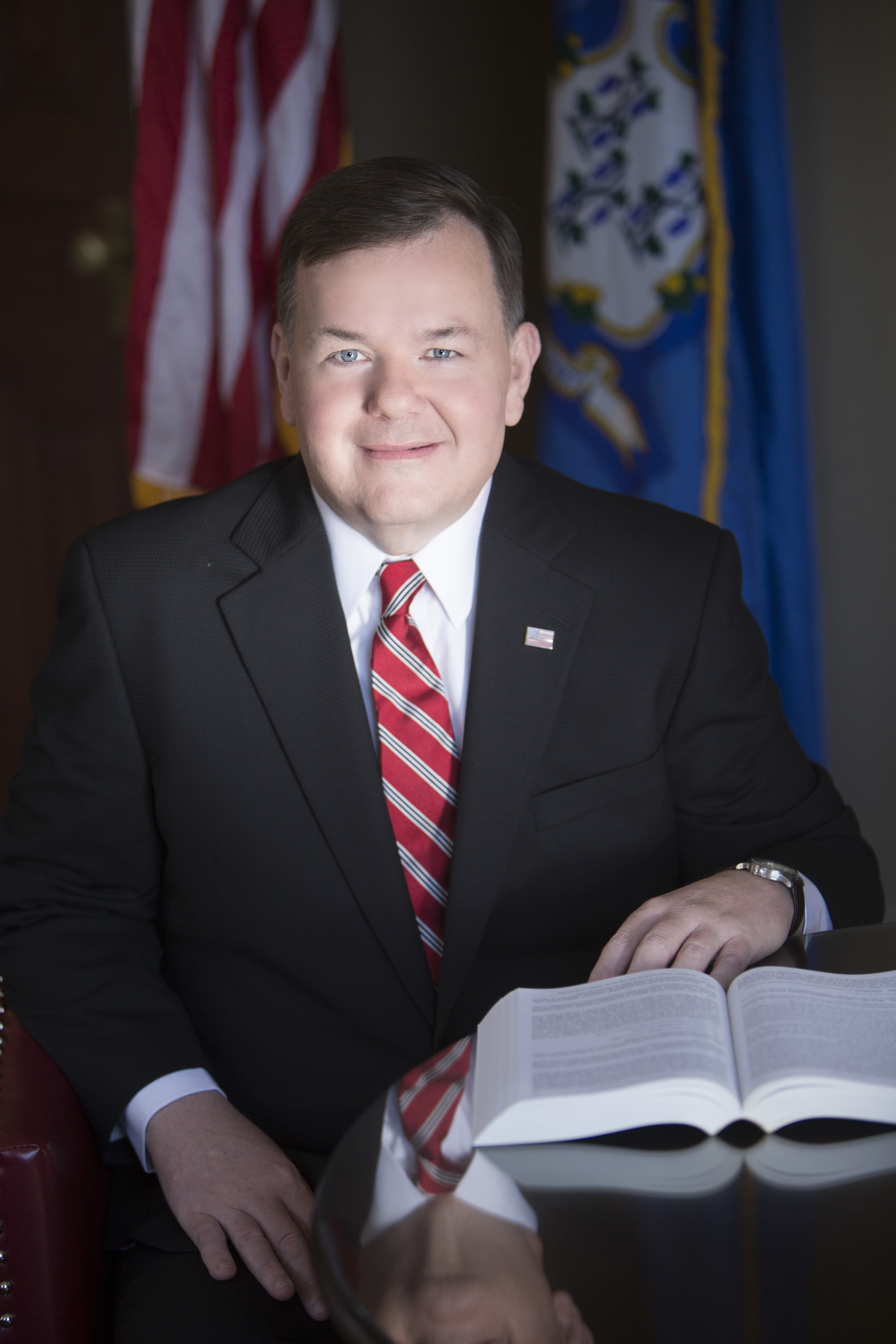

Republican National Committeeman from Connecticut
- Incumbent
- Assumed office February 2007

Member of the Connecticut House of Representatives from the 111th district
- In office January 1999 – January 6, 2021
- Preceded by: Christopher R. Scalzo
- Succeeded by: Aimee Berger-Girvalo

Personal details
- Born: February 8, 1963 (age 63) Greenwich, Connecticut, U.S.
- Party: Republican

John H. Frey (born February 8, 1963) since 1987 is an American real estate broker (with Coldwell Banker Realty), businessman and politician. A member of the Republican Party, he served as a member of the Connecticut House of Representatives for the 111th district from 1999 to 2021.

== Early life and education ==
Frey was born in Greenwich, Connecticut, and raised in Ridgefield. A graduate of Ridgefield High School, he attended Western Connecticut State University.

Frey served as an altar server at St. Mary’s Roman Catholic Church. In that capacity, he assisted at the funeral of actor Cyril Ritchard, which was celebrated by Venerable Servant of God Archbishop Fulton J. Sheen. As a youth, Frey was a member of the Little Singers of Ridgefield, a boys’ choir of St. Mary's Roman Catholic Church in Ridgefield, Connecticut, directed by Monsignor Francis J. Medynski. According to Medynski’s obituary published in the Ridgefield Press, the choir performed both domestically and internationally, including an appearance in Vatican City where they sang for Pope Paul VI.

Frey grew up in Ridgefield, Connecticut, where he developed an interest in local affairs and community involvement. While attending college, he became involved in Ridgefield politics through the campaign of Elizabeth Leonard, a state representative who was running for first selectman. Frey later described Leonard as an important influence in his life, saying that her mentorship extended beyond politics and helped shape his approach to public service.

Frey initially identified as a Democrat before later becoming a Republican and becoming active in the Ridgefield Republican Party. He served on the Ridgefield Republican Town Committee from 1981 to 1998 and later served on the Connecticut Republican State Central Committee from 1989 to 2000 ultimately representing Connecticut on the Republican National Committee.His involvement in local and state party organizations preceded his election to the Connecticut House of Representativesin 1998.

Frey credited members of the Ridgefield community with influencing his approach to civic life. After his father died suddenly when Frey was eight years old, Frey later recalled the support he received from community figures, including Ridgefield dentist and civic leader Peter Yanity, who invited him to participate in Ridgefield Boys Club father-son brunches with Yanity and his son.

Frey has also credited Msgr. Francis J. Medynski, the founding pastor of St. Elizabeth Seton Parish in Ridgefield, as an important influence during his youth. As a child, Frey was a member of Medynski’s Little Singers boys choir, whose many performances included throughout Europe. Frey later recalled that the choir provided formative experiences and reflected the strong sense of community in Ridgefield during that period. He remembered fundraising for the group’s international trips by collecting donations with fellow singers outside local businesses. After Medynski’s death in 2008, Frey described him as one of the key figures outside his family who helped shape his life, citing the priest’s intelligence, humility, patience, and example as lasting influences and role model on his own approach to public service. Reid, Macklin (January 10, 2008). "Msgr. Francis J. Medynski, 86, founder of St. Elizabeth Seton Parish, dies". The Ridgefield Press.

== Career ==
Frey served as a member of the Ridgefield Republican Town Committee from 1981 to 1998 and the Republican State Central Committee from 1989 to 2000.

Before winning election to the state House of Representatives, Frey was appointed chairman of the Connecticut Real Estate Commission in 1995 by former Governor John G. Rowland. Frey held the distinct honor as the commission's youngest chairman in state history. Frey was also appointed 'government representative' for the University of Connecticut Business School Center for Real Estate and Economic Studies.

=== Real estate career ===
Frey has been a Connecticut licensed real estate broker since 1987, forming his own three office firm CENTURY 21 Landmark Properties in 1992. He sold the company to Coldwell Banker Realty in 2015. In 2026, Frey was recognized as the top Coldwell Banker Realty Ridgefield/Redding sales associate in both sales volume and closed units for the fourth month of the year, reflecting continued success in the Connecticut residential real estate market. During the same year, he was named to the RealTrends Verified rankings of America's leading real estate professionals, placing him among the top 1.5% of real estate agents nationwide based on residential sales performance. This was the fourth consecutive year included on that verified list.

=== Republican politics ===
In February 2007, Frey was first elected as the Connecticut National Committeeman to the Republican National Committee. He was re-elected to a four-year term in 2008, a second full term in 2012, third term in 2016, a fourth term in 2020 and a fifth full term in June, 2024 making him the seventh longest serving member in the 168 member committee. Mr. Frey was appointed by RNC Chairman Michael Steele to the RNC Redistricting Committee, which is charged with planning for federal redistricting that begins after 2010. In July 2009, he was elected to the RNC Site Selection Committee. The eight member committee was charged with determining the site of the 2012 Republican National Convention (their recommendation of Tampa, Florida, was ratified by the Republican National Committee). Mr. Frey was appointed to the Committee on Arrangements, charged with the planning and oversight of the 2012 Republican National Convention. He has served on the RNC Rules Committee since 2007. He served as Delegate to all nine conventions since 1992 and Sergeant-at-Arms of the 2016, 2020 and 2024 Republican National Conventions.

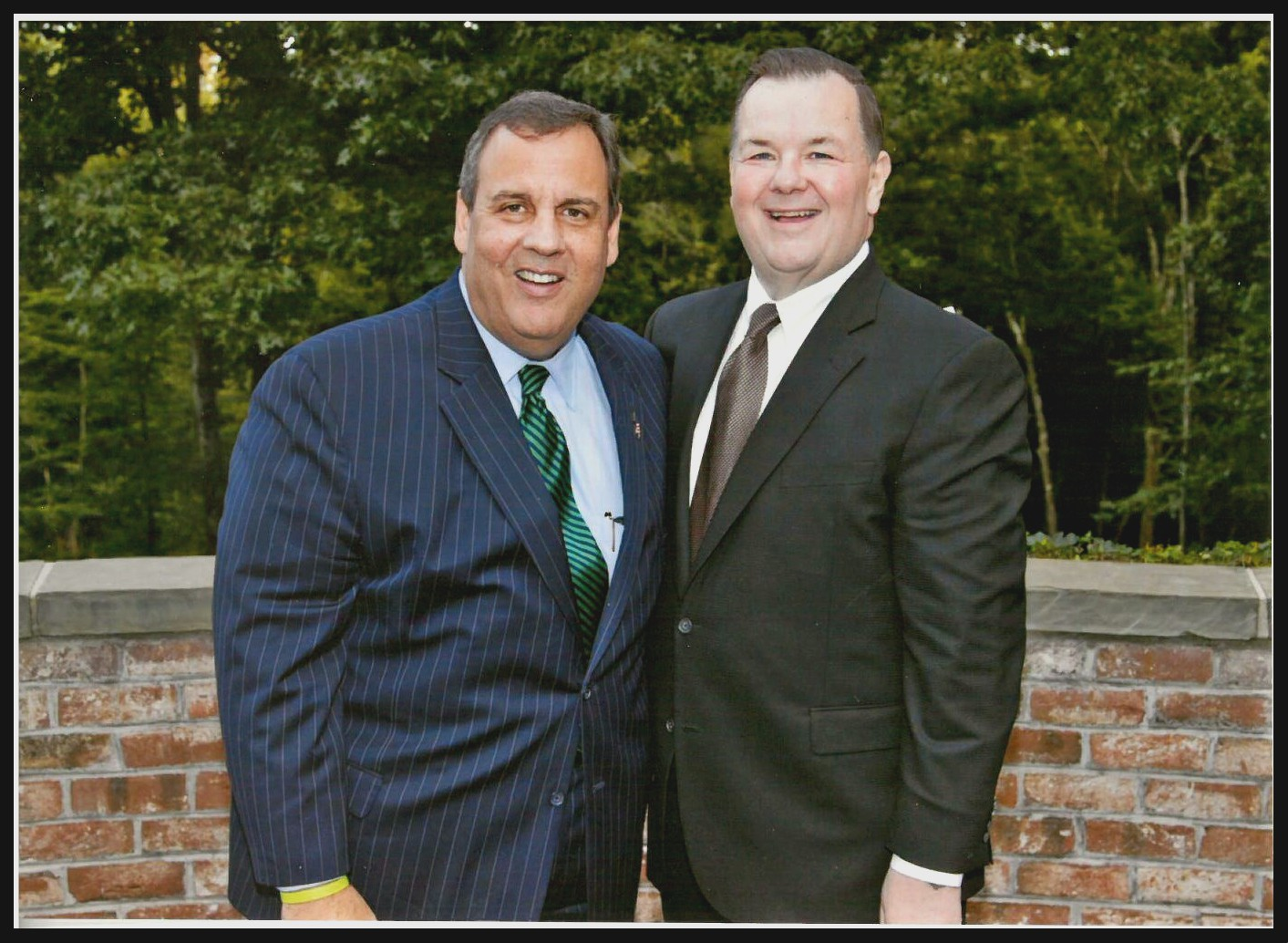
New Jersey Governor Chris Christie (left) and John H Frey October 8, 2015

Mr. Frey was the 5th District coordinator for the Bob Dole 1996 presidential campaign and was a delegate to the Republican National Convention in San Diego, California, where he represented the state as a member of the Platform Committee. In 2004, for the third time he was a delegate to the Republican National Convention and again represented Connecticut on the Platform Committee, where he gained approval for language calling for a more transparent Indian tribe recognition process. He was a delegate to the 2008 Republican National Convention and served on the Rules Committee.

=== Connecticut House of Representatives ===
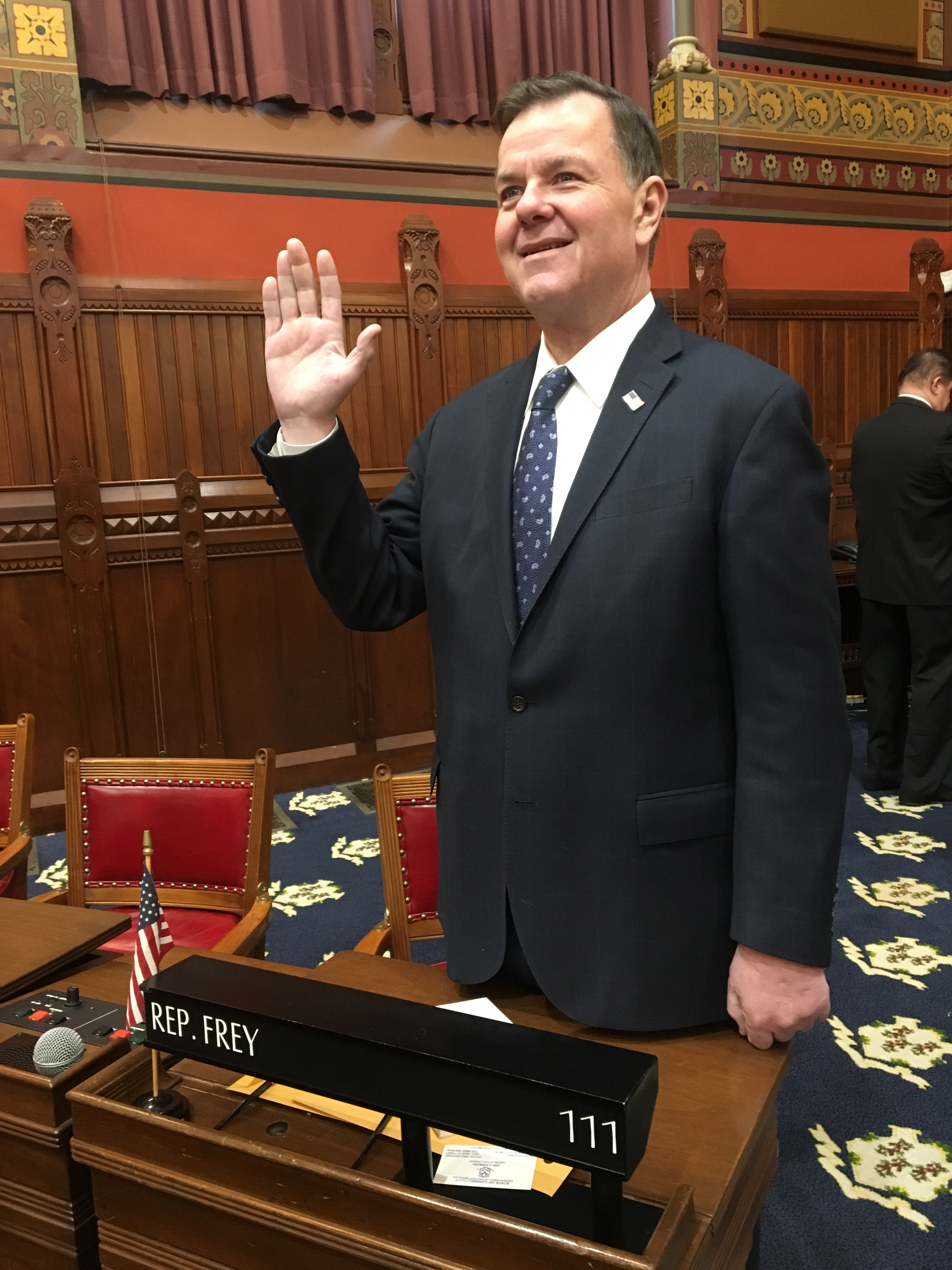
State Representative John Frey taking the oath of office at the State Capitol

Rep. Frey served eleven terms (22 years) in the state legislature as Ridgefield's chief advocate in Hartford, making him the longest served legislator in Ridgefield’s history. One hundred seventy-six state representatives have represented Ridgefield since 1776 (as of 2021). Second to Rep. Frey in tenure was Ridgefield’s first state representative who served 13 years beginning in 1776.

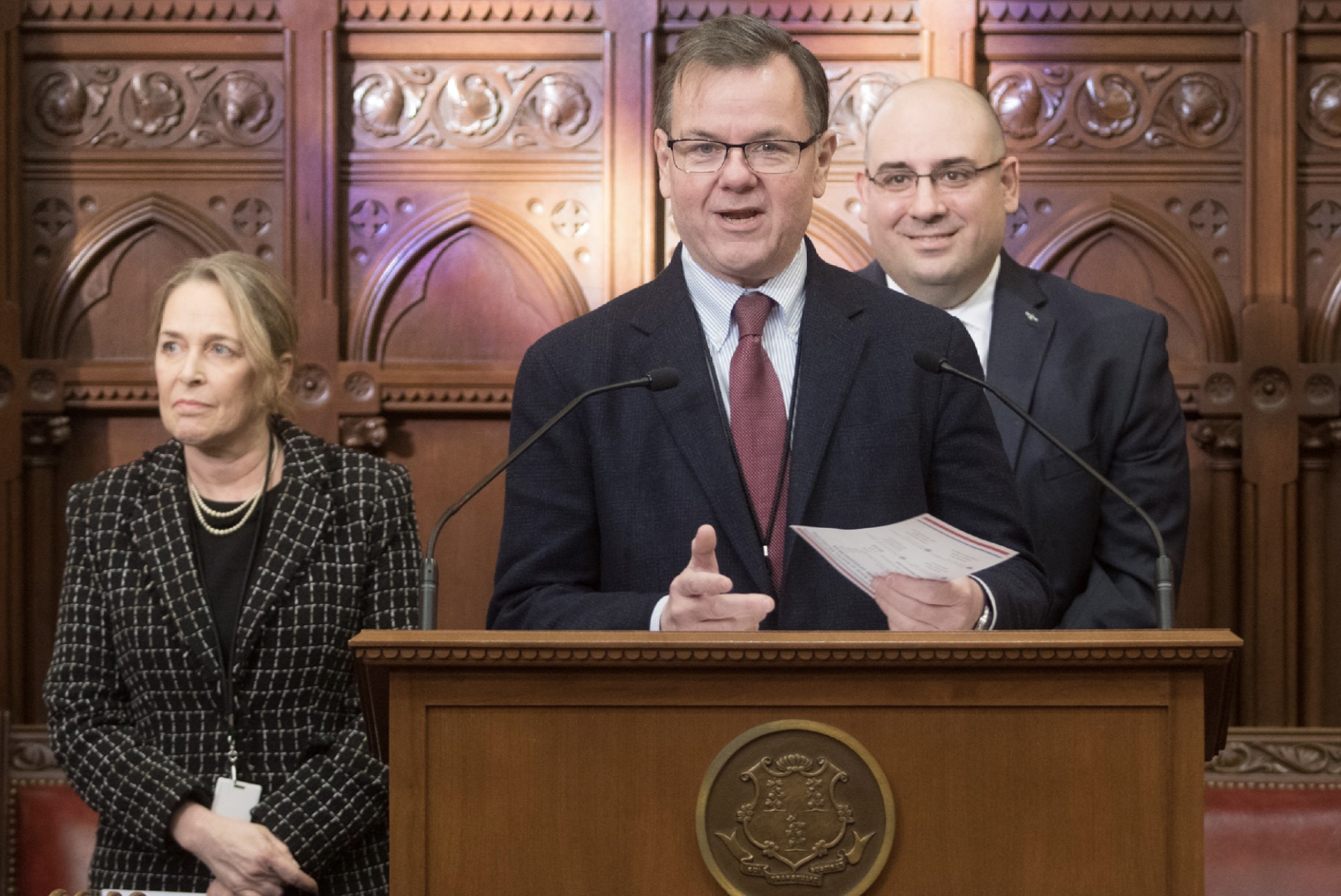
Representative Frey addressing the House Chamber from the Speaker’s podium

Rep. Frey was appointed by the House Minority Leader Themis Klarides to serve as Senior Republican Whip. He served on the Finance, Revenue and Bonding Committee; the Bank Committee and Legislative Management Committee. He also served on the state Aging Commission.

Rep. Frey has supported measures to improve education for students at all grade levels, protect the benefits of seniors and veterans residing in Connecticut, preserve consumers' rights, reform state government, and secure pristine open space areas.

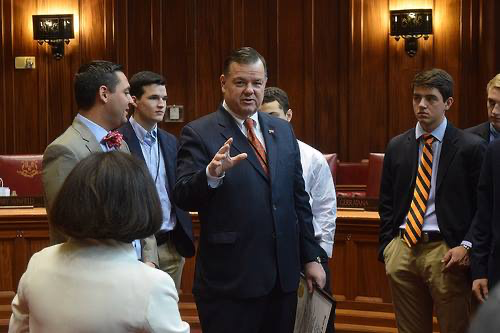
Representative Frey hosting the Ridgefield High School varsity hockey team following its state championship victory

Rep. Frey has also been instrumental in securing state aid for local projects in Ridgefield, including the Ridgefield Playhouse, school construction and improvements, the Ridgefield Veterans Community Center, the Aldrich Museum, Tiger Hollow and the Ridgefield Boys & Girls Club. He is largely credited for gaining funding for the 400-acre (1.6 km^{2}) Bennetts Pond State Park.

In February 2008, the State Bond Commission approved $3.25 million to fund 12 unit expansion of Ballard Green senior housing and rehabilitation of 120 units of affordable and senior housing in Ridgefield. Connecticut Governor M. Jodi Rell thanked Frey for his perseverance in advocating for funding for the project. In October 2008, he secured an additional $640,000 to cover unanticipated funding shortfalls.

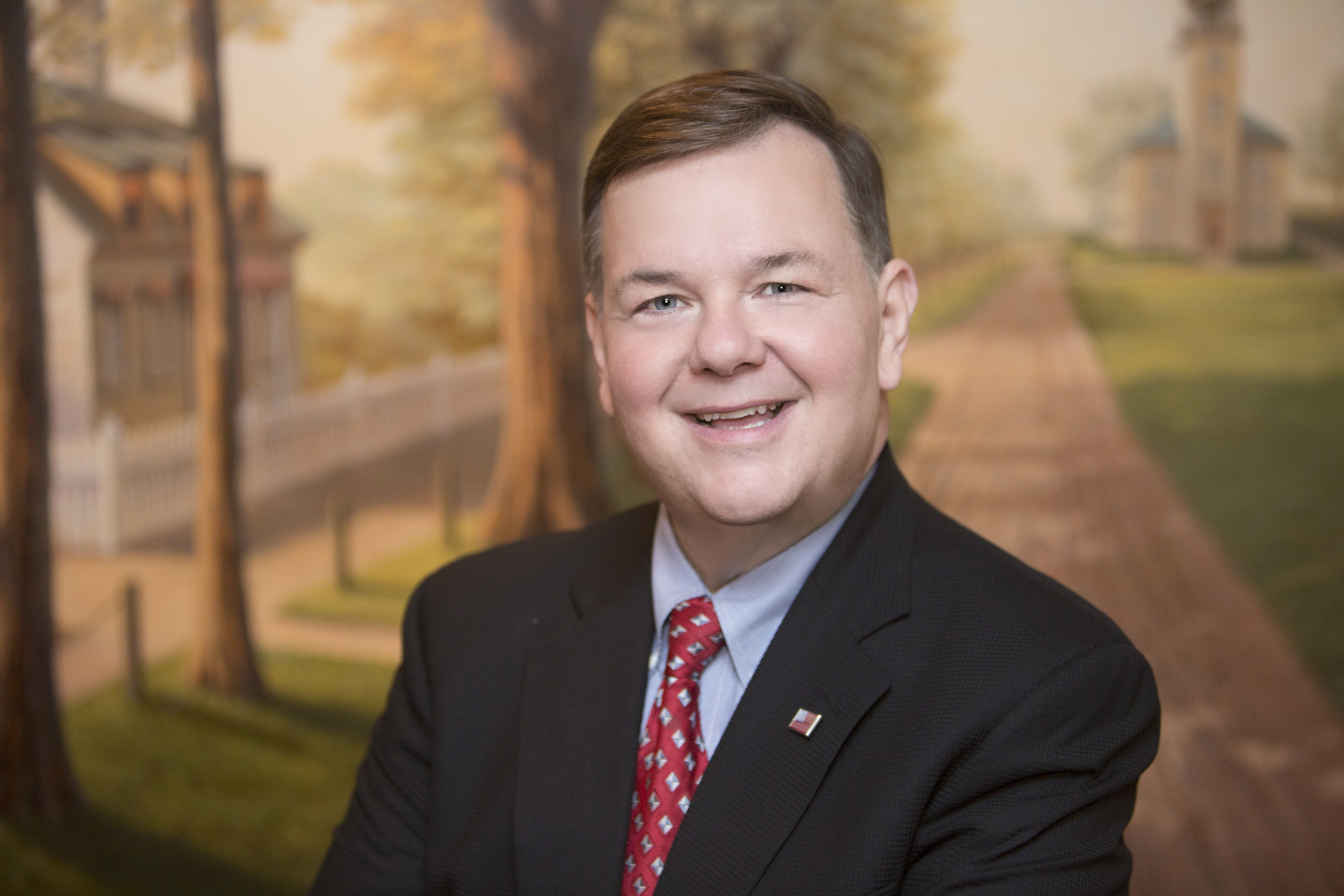
John H Frey, taken at Ridgefield Playhouse

Frey publicly criticized Governor Dannel Malloy following Connecticut-based General Electric’s decision to relocate its headquarters to Massachusetts. He stated that retroactive tax increases and other legislative actions under Malloy’s administration contributed to the company’s decision to explore relocation. Frey also cited concerns expressed at the time by other major corporations, including IBM, Aetna, Travelers, and Ridgefield’s Boehringer Ingelheim, regarding the state’s business climate, reinforcing his close ties to the Connecticut business community. He said that GE formed a relocation committee after these policies were implemented and pointed to specific issues during state negotiations, including a presentation error.

In 2015, during debates over proposed tax increases in the Connecticut legislature, Frey was the first state official to publicly disclose concerns from General Electric that the corporation might leave the state if the tax proposals passed. He told a Finance, Revenue and Bonding Committee hearing that he had received a call from GE’s chief financial officer indicating the company was “considering whether to move its corporate headquarters” because of the proposed tax package. Frey also publicly criticized then‑Governor Dannel P. Malloy for the state’s effort to retain GE, highlighting that the presentation made to company officials included a photograph of a Pratt & Whitney jet engine — a product of a Connecticut competitor — rather than one manufactured by GE, calling the oversight “rank amateur” and saying it underscored the administration’s lack of preparation.

Frey argued that Connecticut’s business climate had become less competitive, referencing CNBC’s “Best States for Business” rankings and comparing GE’s concerns with other state incentive packages, such as the $300 million offered to Jackson Laboratory. He called on the Malloy administration to acknowledge and address these concerns to improve the state’s ability to retain and attract businesses.

In 2015, the Connecticut Post political columnist Ken Dixon included Frey in his annual year‑in‑review commentary, noting that “on June 1 the Democratic budget was essentially wrapped up and ready to go, when veteran Rep. John Frey, R‑Ridgefield, announced his weekend conversation with a sword‑rattling General Electric executive, who intimated that if planned corporate‑tax escalations occurred, the Fairfield‑based multinational would decamp the state.” Dixon wrote that “for this well‑timed declaration, Frey, a member of the Republican National Committee, earned the honorary ‘Dick Belden Rat Patrol Award,’ named for the late Republican lawmaker from Shelton, who every year would cull a shopping list of special‑interest items nestled in the Democratic budget.”

In 2019, the Independent Party of Connecticut unanimously endorsed Frey’s reelection bid for the 111th District, placing him on both the Republican and Independent ballot lines and making him the first Ridgefield legislative candidate to receive the party’s endorsement.

=== Legacy ===
”This isn't John Frey's seat. I'm just a caretaker.”

— John Frey, Connecticut Insider, March 24, 2020

In 2020, Frey announced that he would not seek re-election after 22 years in the Connecticut House of Representatives, concluding the longest tenure of any state representative from Ridgefield. His legislative career included work on transportation, land preservation, local control, public safety, and constituent services.

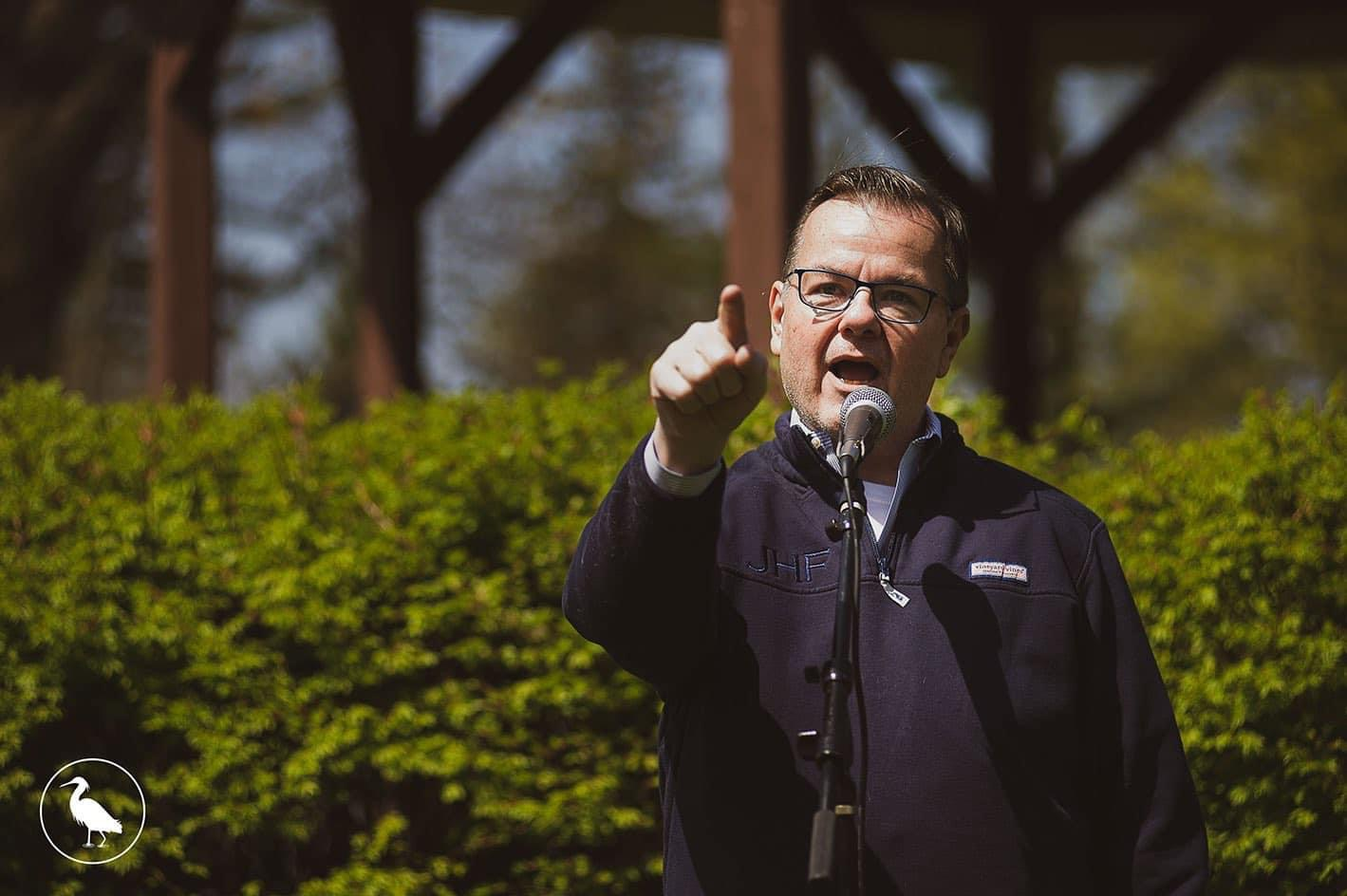
State Representative John Frey addressing a rally in support of preserving local control of housing.

Following the 2012 Sandy Hook Elementary School shooting in neighboring Newtown, Connecticut, Frey had a personal connection to the event as well as a legislative role in its aftermath. Frey's sister, Tricia Gogliettino, had three children attending Sandy Hook Elementary School at the time of the shooting; all three were reported safe following the attack.

As a member of the Connecticut House of Representatives, Frey subsequently worked on school security issues. He sponsored a budget amendment allowing municipalities to use Local Capital Improvement Program (LOCIP) funds for school security improvements, enabling communities across Connecticut to direct state funding toward safety-related projects.

Frey also worked on issues affecting Ridgefield and the surrounding region. During his tenure, he helped secure state support for the widening of Route 7 between Ridgefield and Danbury, a project intended to improve transportation capacity and safety along a major regional corridor. He also supported state funding for the acquisition of Bennett's Pond State Park, preserving open space while reducing the financial burden on the town of Ridgefield.

Beyond his legislative service, Frey remained involved in historic preservation and civic affairs. He served as president of Lounsbury House, was involved with the Ridgefield Historical Society, served on the State Capitol Preservation and Restoration Commission, and was appointed to the Advisory Council on Historic Preservation in 2020, a federal body that advises the President and Congress on historic preservation policy.

Reflecting on his approach to public office after more than two decades in Hartford, Frey described his role as one of stewardship rather than ownership:

This isn't John Frey's seat. I'm just a caretaker.

He similarly described his view of representation as extending beyond party affiliation, stating that after elections conclude, elected officials have a responsibility to represent all constituents:

Once the campaigning is over, you don't represent just one party, you represent everyone. It's time to govern. You represent everybody.

=== Later career ===
In June 2008, he was appointed by President George W. Bush to the President's Commission on White House Fellows.

In June 2020, The White House announced that Frey was appointed by President Donald Trump to serve on the Advisory Council on Historic Preservation (ACHP).

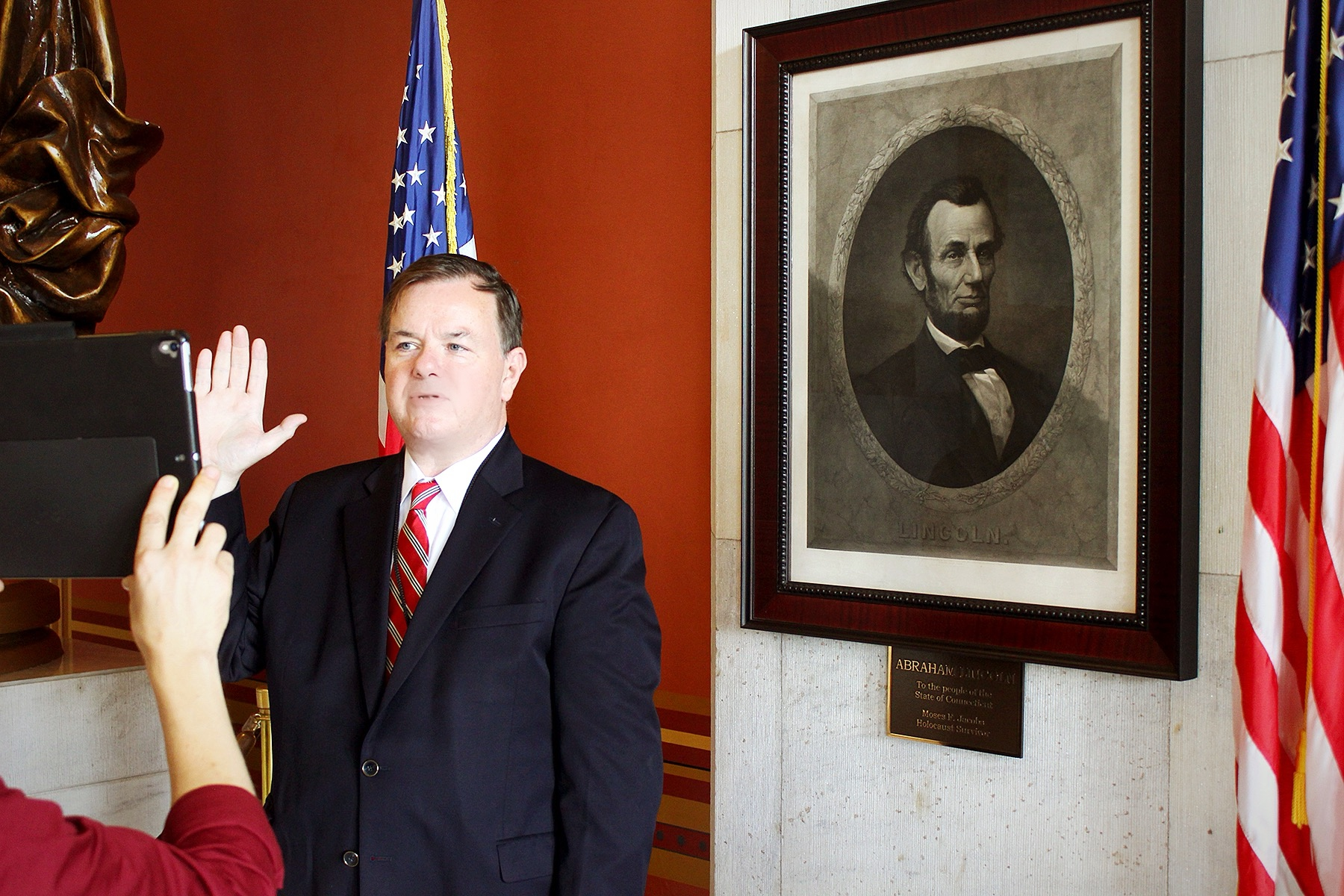
John Frey taking the oath of office as a member of the federal Advisory Council on Historic Preservation.

In November 2021, Frey was elected to the Ridgefield Police Commission, receiving the most votes in all contested seats on the ballot. He previously was appointed to fill a vacancy. He served two years as Chairman. In 2025, he was elected to a second term.

John Frey (left) with Mark Daly, Cathaoirleach of Seanad Éireann, at Stormont in Belfast, 2026.

In September 2024, Frey was appointed to the newly formed CT-Ireland Trade Commission by CT House Republican Leader Vincent Candelora. The appointment is a four year term.

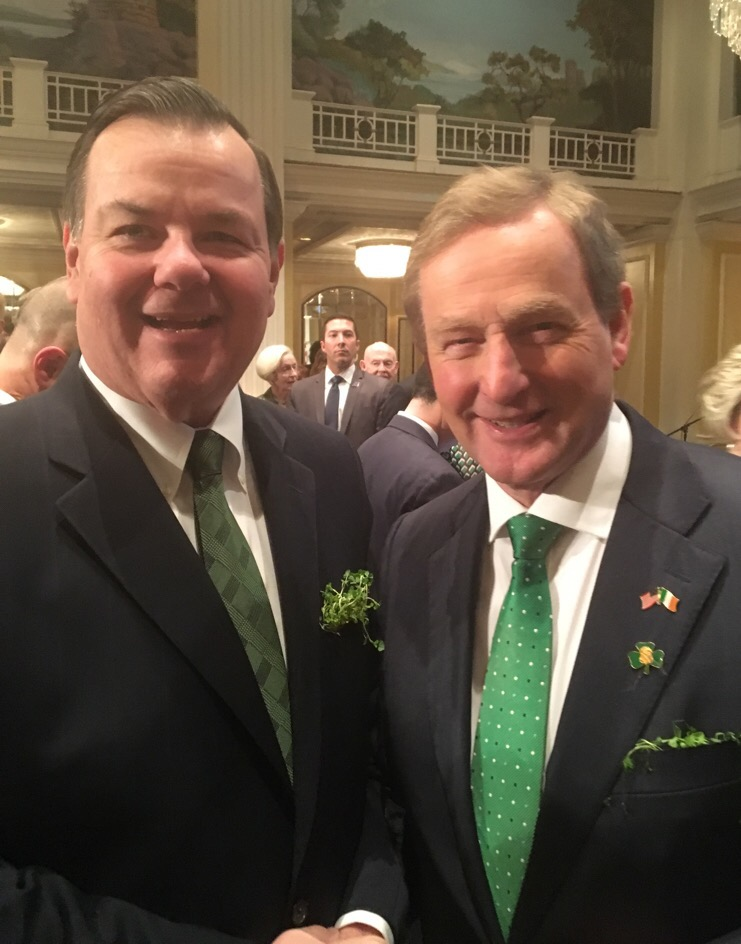
John Frey (left) with Enda Kenny, Taoiseach of Ireland, at the Embassy of Ireland in Washington, D.C.

In December 2025, Frey was appointed to the Board of Advisors of the Governor M. Jodi Rell Center for Public Service at the University of Hartford. The Center, established in honor of Connecticut’s 87th governor, promotes ethics in government, civil discourse, and civic engagement. Frey, who had a long association with Governor Rell dating to their early years in the Connecticut General Assembly, was selected to support the Center’s mission of encouraging ethical leadership and public service. As an advisor, he contributes to programs and initiatives aimed at fostering civic responsibility among students and the broader community.

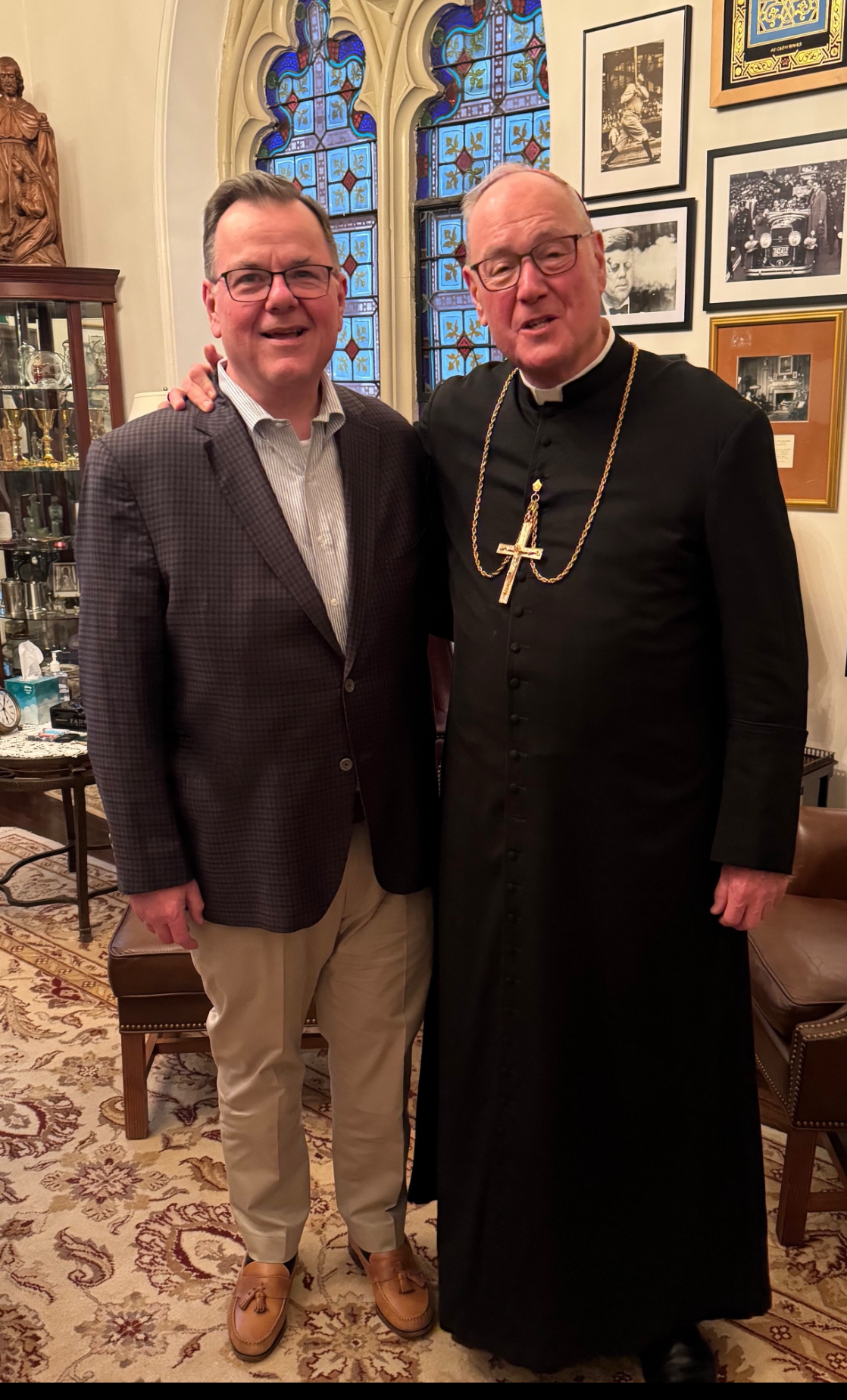
John Frey (left) visits with Timothy Cardinal Dolan, Archbishop of New York, at the Archbishop's residence.

== Cultural districts and arts advocacy ==
While serving in the Connecticut House of Representatives, Frey proposed legislation establishing a framework for municipal cultural districts in Connecticut. He testified before the General Assembly's Planning and Development Committee in support of House Bill 6939, An Act Concerning the Establishment of Municipal Cultural Districts. The legislation was enacted as Public Act 19-143 in July 2019, authorizing Connecticut municipalities to establish cultural districts to promote arts and cultural attractions, tourism, economic development, and public welfare. In 2021, Ridgefield became the first municipality in Connecticut to receive a Cultural District designation. The Ridgefield Press reported that the statewide program originated in Ridgefield with Frey's proposal of the initial legislation. In 2026, the Cultural Alliance of Western Connecticut selected Frey for its Distinguished Cultural Leadership Recognition for his role in advancing Connecticut's Cultural District framework. The recognition, which is not awarded annually, is given at the discretion of the Cultural Alliance's board to individuals whose sustained leadership has had a lasting impact on arts, culture, and community life.

== Awards ==
- 2026 Cultural Alliance of Western Connecticut Distinguished Cultural Leadership Recognition
- 2023 Ridgefield Citizen of the Year
- 2022 Connecticut Republican Party ‘Prescott Bush Award’ recipient (their highest annual award)
- 2021 Ridgefield Cultural Icon Award, recipient of inaugural award
- 2009 Ridgefield Realtor of the Year
- 2009 Legislator of the Year - Police Chiefs Association of CT
- 2009 CT Republicans Frederick Biebel Lifetime Achievement Award
- 2008 Legislator of the Year—CT Recreation and Parks Association
- 2007 Champion of Youth—Ridgefield Boys and Girls Club
- 2006 Larry Award—Aldrich Museum of Contemporary Art
- 2006 UCONN Advocate of the Year
- 2005 Legislator of the Year—Mothers Against Drunk Driving
- 2004 Citizen Award—Ridgefield Kiwanis
- 2002 Legislator of the Year - Uniformed Professional Firefighters Association

== Endorsements ==
- 2008 CT Professional Firefighters Association
- 2008 CT Business and Industry Association
- 2008 CT Association of Realtors
- 2008 CT Education Association
- 2008 CT League of Conservation Voters
- 2008 CT Police Council #15
- 2008 Ridgefield Police Association
- 2008 Ridgefield Open Space Association
