= Aimee Berger-Girvalo =

American politician

Member of the Connecticut House of Representatives from the 111th district
- Incumbent
- Assumed office January 6, 2021
- Preceded by: John H. Frey

Personal details
- Party: Democratic
- Children: 2
- Education: University of Massachusetts Amherst (BA)

Aimee Berger-Girvalo is an American politician and behavioral therapist serving as a member of the Connecticut House of Representatives from the 111th district. Elected in November 2020, she assumed office on January 6, 2021.

== Education ==
Berger-Girvalo earned a Bachelor of Arts degree in developmental disability advocacy from the University of Massachusetts Amherst.

== Career ==
After high school, Berger-Girvalo worked for Hard Rock Cafe International and as a retail manager for Gap Inc. Outside of politics, Berger-Girvalo has worked as an instructional para-educator in the Ridgefield School District and as an applied behavior analysis therapist. She was elected to the Connecticut House of Representatives in November 2020 and assumed office on January 6, 2021.
