= Lenart =

Lenart may refer to:

- Municipality of Lenart, Slovenia
- Lenart v Slovenskih Goricah, the seat of the Municipality of Lenart, Slovenia
- Lenart Regional Gifted Center, United States, school
- Lénárt sphere, an educational model for spherical geometry,
- AntiCMOS, computer virus first discovered at Lenart, which led to its alias of Lenart.
- Jozef Lenárt, a Slovak politician who served as Prime Minister of Czechoslovakia from 1963 to 1968
