= Jane Jansen =

American politician

Member of the Connecticut House of Representatives from the 111th district
- In office November 13, 1985 – 1987
- Preceded by: Martha Rothman
- Succeeded by: Barbara Ireland

Personal details
- Born: Queens, New York, U.S.
- Party: Republican
- Spouse: Cornelius J. Jansen
- Children: 5
- Education: St. John's University

Mary Jane Jansen is an American politician who served in the Connecticut House of Representatives from 1985 to 1987, representing the 111th district as a Republican.

== Personal life ==
Jansen was born in Queens, New York, and met her husband, Cornelius J. Jansen, while attending St. John's University. The couple moved to Ridgefield, Connecticut, in 1970, and later to Pebble Beach, California. They have five children.

== Political career ==
Jansen was elected to the Connecticut House of Representatives in a November 1985 special election after her predecessor, Martha Rothman, resigned. She was sworn in on November 13. Jansen initially ran for reelection in 1986, but withdrew her candidacy on October 8, stating that she and her husband may have to move out of Ridgefield. She remarked, "should I be re-elected and then suddenly pack up and leave, it would be a great disservice to my party and the community". Jansen was succeeded by Democratic candidate Barbara Ireland in 1987.
