= Geoff Eley =

British-born historian of Germany (born 1949)

- Born: Geoffrey Howard Eley; 1949 (age 76–77); Burton upon Trent, Staffordshire, England
- Occupation: Karl Pohrt Distinguished University Professor of Contemporary History at the University of Michigan

Academic background
- Education: Balliol College, Oxford; University of Sussex

Academic work
- Discipline: History
- Sub-discipline: German studies
- Notable students: Lenny Ureña Valerio
- Notable works: The Peculiarities of German History
- Website: Geoff Eley publications on Academia.edu

Geoffrey Howard "Geoff" Eley (born 1949) is a British-born historian of Germany. He studied history at Balliol College, Oxford, and received his PhD from the University of Sussex in 1974. He has taught at the University of Michigan, Ann Arbor in the Department of History since 1979 and the Department of German Studies since 1997. He now serves as the Karl Pohrt Distinguished University Professor of Contemporary History at Michigan.

Eley's early work focused on the radical nationalism in Imperial Germany and fascism, but has since grown to include theoretical and methodological reflections on historiography and the history of the political left in Europe.

Eley is particularly well known for his early study, The Peculiarities of German History (first published in German as Mythen deutscher Geschichtsschreibung in 1984), co-authored with David Blackbourn (a fellow Briton, who now teaches at Vanderbilt University), which challenged the orthodoxy in German social history known as the Sonderweg thesis. His most successful book is Forging Democracy: The History of the Left in Europe, 1850-2000, which has been translated into Spanish, Portuguese, Serbian, Korean, Turkish and Greek. Recently, he published a collection of essays on fascism called Nazism as Fascism: Violence, Ideology, and the Ground of Consent in Germany, 1930-1945 with Routledge Press.

== Works ==
(This list does not include edited volumes.)

- The Modernist Wish: A History of Europe, 1914-1939. Cambridge and New York: Cambridge University Press, 2026. ISBN 978-0521811453
- Nazism as Fascism: Violence, Ideology, and the Ground of Consent in Germany, 1930-1945. London: Routledge, 2013 ISBN 978-0415812634
- After the Nazi Racial State: Difference and Democracy in Germany and Europe. Ann Arbor: University of Michigan Press, 2009. ISBN 978-0472033447
- The Future of Class in History: What's Left of the Social? (with Keith Nield). Ann Arbor: University of Michigan Press, 2007. ISBN 978-0472069644
- A Crooked Line: From Cultural History to the History of Society. Ann Arbor: University of Michigan Press, 2005. ISBN 0472069047
- Forging Democracy: The History of the Left in Europe, 1850-2000. New York: Oxford University Press, 2002. ISBN 0195044797
- Reshaping the German Right: Radical Nationalism and Political Change after Bismarck. London and New Haven: Yale University Press, 1980; new ed. 1991. ISBN 0472081322
- Wilhelminismus, Nationalismus, Faschismus: Zur historischen Kontinuität in Deutschland. Münster: Verlag Westfälisches Dampfboot, 1991. ISBN 3924550476
- Review article: "Labor History, Social History, Alltagsgeschichte: Experience, Culture, and the Politics of the Everyday--a New Direction for German Social History?" The Journal of Modern History Vol. 61, No. 2, June 1989
- From Unification to Nazism: Reinterpreting the German Past. London: Routledge, 1986. ISBN 0415084881
- The Peculiarities of German History (with David Blackbourn). Oxford: Oxford University Press, 1984. ISBN 0198730578
