= Martha Rothman =

American politician

Member of the Connecticut House of Representatives from the 111th district
- In office 1982–1985
- Preceded by: Elizabeth Leonard
- Succeeded by: Jane Jansen

Personal details
- Party: Republican

Martha D. Rothman is an American politician who served in the Connecticut House of Representatives from 1982 to 1985, representing the 111th district as a Republican. She was first elected in a 1982 special election after Elizabeth Leonard retired to serve as first selectman of Ridgefield. Rothman retired in 1985 to move from Ridgefield to California and was succeeded by Jane Jansen.
