= Michael Leonard =

Michael Leonard is the name of:

- Michael Leonard (field hockey) (born 1974), Scottish field hockey player
- Mike Leonard (journalist) (born 1947), American television journalist
- Mick Leonard (Australian footballer) (1914–1984), Australian footballer
- Mick Leonard (English footballer) (born 1959), English footballer
- Mick Leonard (Scottish footballer) (born 1953), Scottish footballer
- Michael Leonard (cyclist) (born 2004), Canadian cyclist
- Michael Leonard (Masterchef)
