= Herbert V. Camp =

American lawyer and politician (1935–2022)

Herbert Viets Camp Jr.

Member of the Connecticut House of Representatives from the 111th district
- In office 1968–1976
- Preceded by: Bruce L. Morris
- Succeeded by: Elizabeth Leonard

Personal details
- Born: March 31, 1935
- Died: February 14, 2022 (aged 86)
- Party: Republican

Herbert Viets Camp Jr. (March 31, 1935 – February 14, 2022) was an American lawyer and politician.

Camp was born in Hartford, Connecticut, and grew up in New Britain, Connecticut. He graduated from Wesleyan University in 1957 and from Columbia Law School in 1960. Camp clerked for a United States federal judge in California for one year. He then practiced law in New York City, New York. Camp moved with his wife and family to Ridgefield, Connecticut, and continued to practice law. He was also involved with the real estate business. Camp served in the Connecticut House of Representatives from 1968 to 1976 and was a Republican. He closed his law practice and moved with his wife to Stony Creek, Connecticut. in 2008. He died in Stony Creek on February 14, 2022, at the age of 86.
