= James Leonard =

James Leonard may refer to:

- Bobo Leonard (James Leonard), American Negro League baseball player
- James Leonard, co-host of The Two Norries podcast
- James Leonard, one of the co-proprietors of the Beverly Cotton Manufactory
- James A. Leonard (1841–1862), American chess master
- James C. Leonard (1825–1891), Congregationalist minister in Australia
- James E. Leonard, Chief of Department for the New York City Fire Department
- James F. Leonard (1920–2020), United States Ambassador to the United Nations
- James Weston Leonard (1853–1909), politician of southern Africa
- Jim Leonard (American football, born 1899) (1899–1978), American football lineman
- Jim Leonard (American football, born 1910) (1910–1993), American football player and coach
- Jim Leonard (American football, born 1957), American football player
- Jim Leonard (photographer) (1950–2014), storm chaser, photographer and videographer
- Jimmy Leonard (born 1927), Irish politician

== See also ==
- Jim Leonhard (born 1982), American football player
