= Lenny the Lion =

Lenny the Lion may refer to:

- Lenny the Lion, puppet appearing with English ventriloquist Terry Hall
- Lenny the Lion, character on American comedy-variety television show Saturday Night Live
- Lenny the Lion, character in Dutch/Japanese animated television series Ox Tales
- Lenny the Lion, club mascot of English football club Shrewsbury Town F.C.
- Lenny the Lion, mascot of the Lionel Corporation
- Lenny the Lion, ambassador character for children's diabetes created by Medtronic
- Lenny the Lion, mascot of the British and Irish Lions rugby union team
