= Christopher R. Scalzo =

American politician and businessman

Member of the Connecticut House of Representatives from the 111th district
- In office January 4, 1995 – January 6, 1999
- Preceded by: Barbara Ireland
- Succeeded by: John H. Frey

Personal details
- Born: December 27, 1963 (age 62) Peekskill, New York, U.S.
- Party: Republican
- Education: Fordham University (BA)

Christopher R. Scalzo is an American former politician and businessman.

Born in Peekskill, New York. Scalzo received his bachelor's degree in economics from Fordham University in 1985. He worked in the currency market. From 1995 to 1998, Scalzo served in the Connecticut House of Representatives and was a Republican, serving the 111th General Assembly district. While serving as a representative, he lived in Ridgefield, Connecticut. In 1998, Scalzo ran unsuccessfully for the office of Connecticut Comptroller, ultimately losing to Nancy Wyman, who went on to become the first woman elected as Lieutenant Governor of Connecticut.

After losing the race for Comptroller in 1998, Scalzo worked as a development officer at Yale University from 2000 to 2003. He later relocated to Washington, D.C., where he worked in the United States Department of State in various roles from 2004 to 2009. After leaving the State Department, Scalzo began work in the IBM Global Services arm of IBM. Scalzo currently resides in Washington, D.C., continues to work for IBM, now as a Foreign Affairs Account Manager.

In 2018, he became a Private Sector Fellow at the Dwight D. Eisenhower School for National Security and Resource Strategy.

== Notes ==
Party political offices
Preceded by Gene Gavin	Republican Party nominee for Connecticut Comptroller; 1998	Succeeded by Steven Mullins
