= Edwin Leonard =

American Civil War Medal of Honor recipient

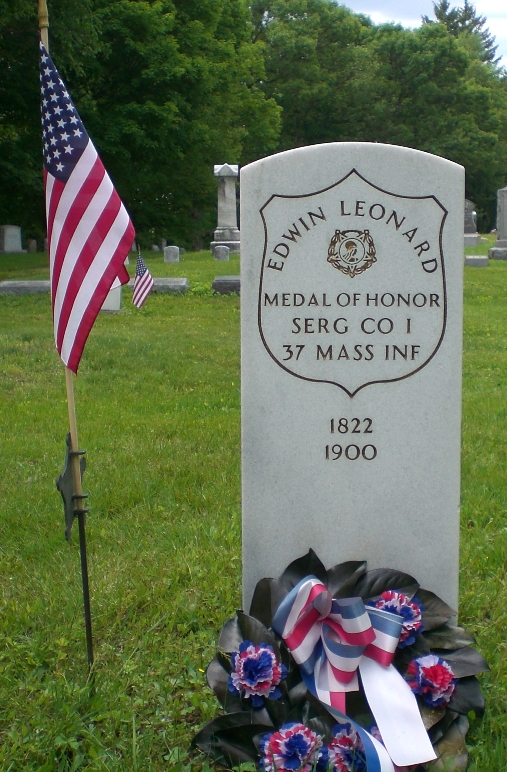
- Grave of Edwin Leonard, Medal of Honor recipient
- Born: November 17, 1823; Agawam, Massachusetts, US
- Died: April 5, 1900 (aged 76)
- Burial place: Elm Street Cemetery, near the Old White Church on Meeting House Hill; West Springfield, Massachusetts
- Military career
- Allegiance: United States of America; Union
- Branch: United States Army; Union Army
- Rank: Sergeant
- Units: Company I, 37th Massachusetts Volunteer Infantry Regiment
- Conflicts: American Civil War
- Awards: Medal of Honor

Edwin Leonard (November 17, 1823 – April 5, 1900) was a Sergeant in the Union Army and a Medal of Honor recipient for his actions in the American Civil War. He is buried in the Elm Street Cemetery in West Springfield, Massachusetts.

== Medal of Honor citation ==
Rank and organization: Sergeant, Company I, 37th Massachusetts Infantry. Place and date: Near Petersburg, Va., June 18, 1864. Entered service at: Agawam, Mass. Birth: Agawam, Mass. Date of issue: August 16, 1894.

Citation:

Voluntarily exposed himself to the fire of a Union brigade to stop their firing on the Union skirmish line.

== See also ==
- List of Medal of Honor recipients for the American Civil War: G–L
