= Leonard Decof =

American lawyer

Leonard Decof (1924 – December 31, 2010) was an American trial lawyer from Rhode Island, known for his many notable cases.

== Early life and education ==
Decof was born in Providence, Rhode Island, the son of Morty and Rose Metz Decof. He received his bachelor's degree from Yale University in 1948 and his law degree from Harvard Law School in 1953.

== Career ==
Decof served as a captain in the United States Marine Corps. He served during World War II in the Pacific Theater of Operations in Guam from 1943 to 1946 and at Parris Island, South Carolina from 1950 to 1952.

He established the law firm of Decof & Decof in 1975. His son, Mark B. Decof, became his law partner in 1980.

Decof practiced tort law, including medical malpractice, product liability, and personal injury, as well as antitrust and commercial litigation. He was known for his skill as a trial lawyer. He won a landmark case establishing the right of medical insurance policyholders to sue malpractice insurers under antitrust laws. His cases reached the Supreme Court several times, and successfully argued three cases before the Court.

Decof also successfully represented Victor DeCosta in an unfair competition and copyright infringement against CBS; DeCosta had created a character that CBS later used in one of its television Western Have Gun – Will Travel.

In 1975, Decof represented Lawrence Ketvirtis in a $1.5 million lawsuit against the basketball player Marvin Barnes. Ketvirtis alleged that Barnes attacked him with a tire iron, causing permanent physical injury, while the two men were teammates at Providence College. He won the case, with the jury returning a $10,000 verdict for Ketvirtis.

In 1991, at the request of Governor Bruce Sundlun, Decof represented the State of Rhode Island in litigation following "the collapse of the insurance system that backed state credit unions." He recovered hundreds of millions of dollars for the state, for which he received a public commendation from Governor Lincoln Almond in February 2001.

An avid golfer, Decof served as counsel in several golf-related legal matters. He was counsel for Karsten Manufacturing (Ping) in a lawsuit against the United States Golf Association over its ban of its U-grooved golf clubs from the PGA Tour (the suit was settled out-of-court in 1993), and served as special counsel to the Callaway Golf Company. He also represented Nike Golf and several professional golfers, including Adam Scott, Greg Norman, Sam Snead, Billy Casper, and Gardner Dickinson.

Decof was a member of the Rhode Island Bar Association, American Bar Association, Association of Trial Lawyers of America, International Academy of Trial Lawyers, Inner Circle of Advocates, and the International Society of Barristers, a diplomate of the American Board of Trial Advocates, and a fellow of the American College of Trial Lawyers and American Law Institute. He lectured before several bar associations and at several law schools and wrote a number of published legal pieces.

== Personal life and death ==
Decof had residences in Providence, Rhode Island and Palm Beach Gardens, Florida. He was Jewish.

He died on December 31, 2010, at the age of 86.
