= AntiCMOS =

Computer virus

Malware details
- Technical name: AntiCMOS.A
- Aliases: Lenart, Anti-CMOS
- Type: DOS
- Subtype: Boot virus
- Classification: Virus
- Family: AntiCMOS
- Isolation date: January 1994
- Origin: China
- Author: Unknown (possibly Li Xibin)

AntiCMOS.B

Malware details
- Technical name: AntiCMOS.B
- Alias: LiXi
- Type: DOS
- Subtype: Boot virus
- Classification: Virus
- Family: AntiCMOS
- Isolation date: Mid-1995
- Origin: China
- Author: Li Xibin

AntiCMOS.C

Malware details
- Technical name: AntiCMOS.C
- Alias: Anti-CMOS.C
- Type: DOS
- Subtype: Boot virus
- Classification: Virus
- Family: AntiCMOS
- Isolation date: 1995
- Origin: China (?)
- Author: Unknown (possibly Li Xibin)

AntiCMOS is a boot virus. Its first discovery was at Lenart, Slovenia, which led to its alias of Lenart. It was isolated in Hong Kong several times at the beginning of 1994, but did not become common until it spread to North America in the Spring of 1995. AntiCMOS is a fairly standard boot virus, and is primarily notable for being one of the few DOS viruses to remain in the wild as of 2020.

AntiCMOS is so named because it has the intended effect of erasing all CMOS information. This is true of all AntiCMOS variants that have appeared in the wild. The payload date of December 1993 and the obsolete nature of these variants makes it very unlikely that AntiCMOS's payload will ever be a threat.

== AntiCMOS.B ==
AntiCMOS.B is a boot virus. It was isolated in mid-1995. Like AntiCMOS.A, AntiCMOS.B became common worldwide. However, this variant never reached the success level of the original, and is now considered obsolete. Infected floppy disks contain the following text:

I am Li Xibin

Additionally, AntiCMOS.B attempts to play a tune, but this fails due to coding errors . AntiCMOS.B is otherwise a typical boot virus, much like its predecessor.

== AntiCMOS.C ==
AntiCMOS.C is a boot virus and very minor variant of the AntiCMOS family. Unlike AntiCMOS and AntiCMOS.B, AntiCMOS.C remained in the field for a very short period of time, and is now considered entirely obsolete.

== See also ==
- AntiEXE
