= Lenard =

Lenard is a surname. Notable people with the name include:

- Aldon Lewis Lenard (1921–2007), a Canadian sports person
- Alexander Lenard (1910–1972), a Hungarian physician, writer, and translator
- Henry M. Lenard (1903–1983), an American politician
- Joan A. Lenard (born 1952), American judge
- Josephine Lenard (1921–2007), American baseball player
- Mark Lenard (1924–1996), American actor
- Michael Lenard (born 1955), American handball player
- Philipp Lenard (1862–1947), Hungarian-German physicist, winner of the 1905 Nobel Prize for Physics, and Chief of Aryan Physics under the Nazis
- Voshon Lenard (born 1973), American basketball player

== See also ==
- Leonard, given name and surname
- Lennard, given name and surname
