= James A. Leonard =

- Leonard in an 1881 sketch

Personal information
- Born: November 6, 1841 Ireland
- Died: September 26, 1862 (aged 20) Annapolis, Maryland

Chess career
- Country: Ireland; United States

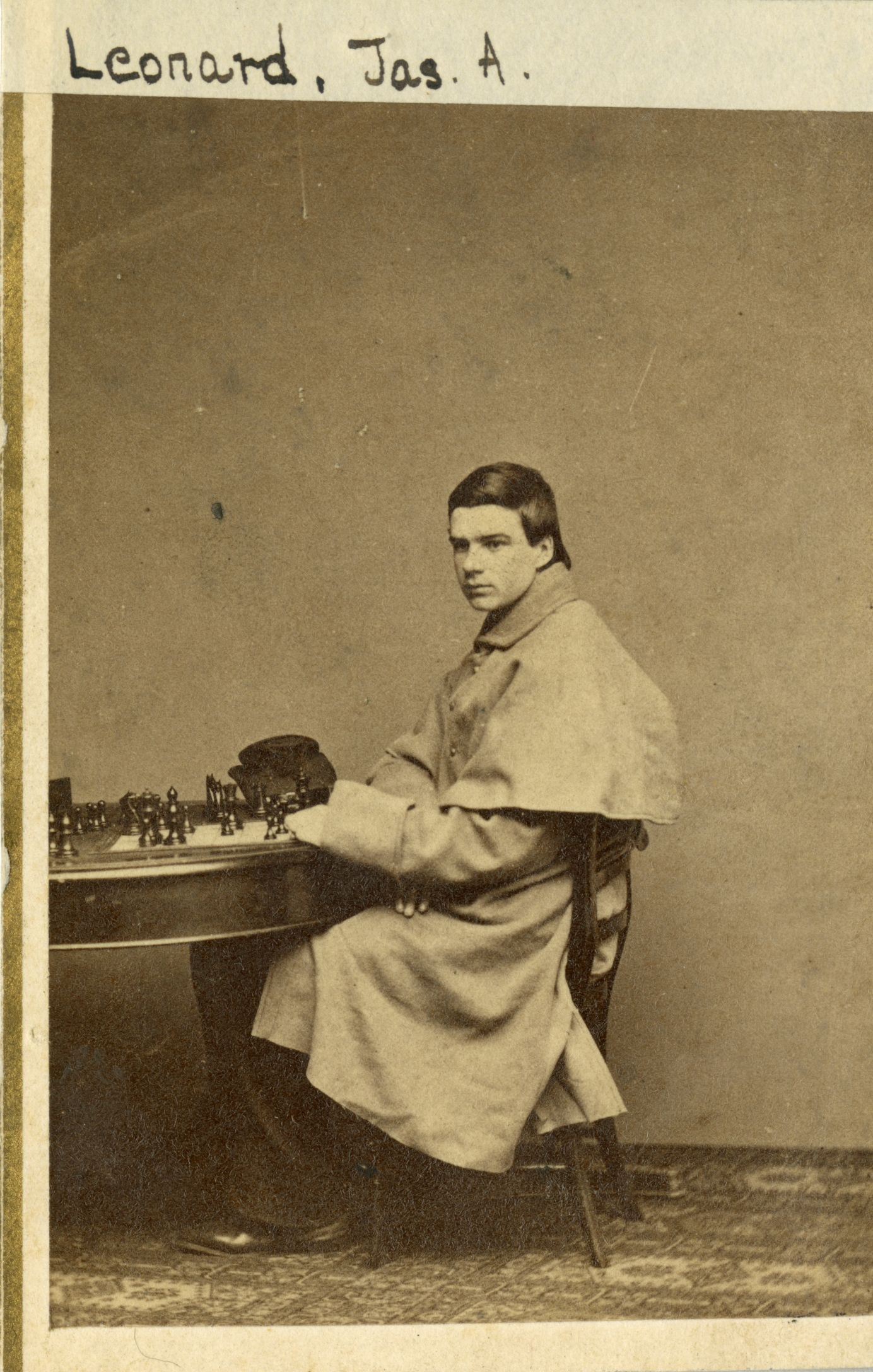
James A. Leonard

James A. Leonard (November 6, 1841 Ireland – September 26, 1862 Annapolis, Maryland) was an American chess master, who grew up as a son of poor Irish immigrants in New York City. He learned to play chess at age 16 or 17. Before his 20th birthday, he was already famous for his fierce attacking play and prowess at blindfold chess, at which he played as many as ten games simultaneously.

In 1862 he fought for the Union in the American Civil War. He was captured and, while being held as a prisoner of war, died of dysentery before reaching his 21st birthday. Commentators have compared his promise, never realized, to that of American chess giants Paul Morphy and Harry Nelson Pillsbury.

== Early life ==
Nineteenth-century chess journalists and Jeremy Gaige's book Chess Personalia: A Biobibliography state that Leonard was born in New York City. However, his biographer John S. Hilbert, states, based on Leonard's military records, that "recent evidence strongly suggests he was born in Ireland".

Leonard grew up in New York City with his parents, who were poor, working-class Irish immigrants. Hilbert believes, based on 1850 United States census records, that his parents may have been John Leonard, a cabinet maker, and his wife Eleanor. Leonard also had a brother Joseph, about two years his junior.

== Chess career ==
Leonard learned chess at age 16 or 17. He played chess primarily at the Morphy Chess Rooms in New York. Chess journalist Myron Hazeltine remarked that Leonard was the Rooms' "light and lustre". In the summer of 1860, he won the second New York Handicap tournament held there. In October 1860, Paul Morphy, the de facto world chess champion, visited New York and played Leonard, giving him rook odds. The result of the game is unknown.

In 1861, Leonard visited Philadelphia, where he played a match against William Dwight, who later became a general in the Union Army. The match was a class of chess cultures. Leonard wrote of Dwight, to Hazeltine, "OH GOLLY ain't he a slow player! ... He considers 3 moves a side every hour as getting along very fast." The Philadelphians treated Leonard as a social inferior, and took offense at an article about the match he published in the New York Clipper. Francis Well wrote of that article in the Philadelphia Evening Bulletin, "It is as vulgar, coarse, and illiterate as might be expected from anything emitting from such a source, and published in such a column." The match was a disaster for Leonard, whose second stole his money, leaving him penniless. Leonard returned to New York with the match unfinished, while leading with six wins, two draws, and three losses, and needing only one more win for victory in the match.

By late 1861, Leonard was giving simultaneous exhibitions of blindfold chess, commonly on eight boards. Hazeltine referred to Leonard's "wonderful blindfold séances in the Fall of 1861, the Winter and Spring of 1862". The most blindfold games that Leonard ever played simultaneously was apparently ten, in New York on November 16, 1861. He scored four wins, two draws, and four losses. The number of boards played by Leonard was close to the world record, which was then held by Louis Paulsen, who had played as many as 12 blindfold games simultaneously.

Biographer Hilbert writes that "during his short career he won three major New York tournaments and defeated all the finest chessplayers of the city, and most of the finest players in the country, save one. Although the two main chess matches he played were left unfinished, his dominance in those matches was evident."

== Civil War, death ==
On February 1, 1862, Leonard enlisted on the side of the Union in the American Civil War in Company F., 88 N.Y. Volunteers, an Irish regiment. After seven days of battles, he was captured by the Confederate Army. While held in a facility in Annapolis, Maryland that housed prisoners of war captured by both sides, he contracted scorbutic dysentery and died on September 26, 1862.

== Legacy ==
Chess historian Edward Winter writes that Leonard "acquired fame among his contemporaries for his brilliant attacks and blindfold prowess". William Ewart Napier wrote in the mid-1930s, "Among the neglected masters of this country who should be kindly remembered as exhibiting the premonitory signs and urge of champions was Leonard. In style, he was no doubt frankly satellited to Morphy, whose exploits were still a fresh memory in Leonard's day."

James D. Séguin, in a tribute to Harry Nelson Pillsbury on page 127 of the July 1906 American Chess Bulletin (reprinted from the New Orleans Times-Democrat) remarked of Leonard:

With the admitted exception of the king of chess kings, our own Paul Morphy, Pillsbury assuredly stands as the finest exponent of the game that America has yet produced – unless perhaps on a plane with him may be placed the natural (though never fairly developed) capacity of that remarkable if erratic and early eclipsed genius of the early sixties, James Leonard, of New York, whose life so soon disappeared amid the smoke and gloom of battle in the great Civil War. But, of course, lack of opportunity to attain development of genius on Leonard's side precludes fair comparison in this instance.

Gustavus Reichhelm went even further, writing in 1898 that Leonard "was, after Morphy, the most promising player America ever produced". In 2005, a biography of Leonard by chess historian John S. Hilbert was published, entitled The Tragic Life and Short Chess Career of James A. Leonard, 1841–1862.

== Notable games ==
Position: a8 black rook, d8 black queen, h8 black rook, a7 black pawn, b7 black pawn, d7 black knight, f7 black king, g7 black pawn, h7 black pawn, b6 black bishop, e6 black knight, c5 black pawn, a4 white queen, c4 white bishop, a3 white bishop, c3 white knight, a2 white pawn, f2 white pawn, g2 white pawn, h2 white pawn, d1 white rook, g1 white king

Position after 17.Rd1

Leonard vs. Matthews, Brooklyn Chess Club, blindfold exhibition, November 30, 1861
1. e4 e5 2. Nf3 Nc6 3. Bc4 Bc5 4. b4 Bxb4 5. c3 Bc5 6. 0–0 d6 7. d4 exd4 8. cxd4 Bb6 9. Nc3 Nf6 10. e5 dxe5 11. Ba3 Nxd4 12. Nxe5 Be6 13. Re1 c5 14. Qa4+ Nd7 15. Nxf7 Kxf7 16. Rxe6 Nxe6 17. Rd1 (diagram) Kg6? According to Fritz 8, Black could have achieved approximate equality by sacrificing his queen with 17...Nf6! 18.Rxd8 Raxd8 19.f4 Ke7. 18. Bxe6 Qe7 19. Qg4+ Qg5 20. Bf5+ Kf6 21. Rd6+ Ke5 22. Re6# 1–0

Position: a8 black rook, f8 black rook, b7 black pawn, d7 black king, a6 black pawn, d6 white pawn, g6 black pawn, h6 black pawn, b5 white pawn, c5 white pawn, d5 black knight, f5 black pawn, a4 white knight, e4 black bishop, f4 white pawn, b2 white bishop, g2 white pawn, h2 white pawn, a1 white rook, e1 white rook, g1 white king

Position after 24...Nd5

Leonard vs. L. Mark, New York, date unknown
1. e4 e5 2.Nf3 Nc6 3. Bc4 h6 4. d4 exd4 5. 0-0 d6 6 .Nxd4 Ne5 7. Bb3 c5 8. f4 Nc6 9. Qh5 g6 10. Qd5 Qc7 11. Nb5 Qd7 12. e5 Nb4 13. Nxd6+ Bxd6 14. Qxd6 Qxd6 15. exd6 Be6 16. a3 Bxb3 17. axb4 Bxc2 18. bxc5 f5 19. b4 Nf6 20. Nc3 a6 21. Re1+ Be4 22. Bb2 Rf8 23. b5 Kd7 24. Na4 Nd5 (diagram) 25. c6+ bxc6 26. Nc5+ Kd6 27. Ba3 Rfe8 28. Nxe4+ Kd7 29. bxc6+ Kxc6 30. Rac1+ Kb6 31. Bc5+ Kc7 32. Ba7+ Kb7 33. Nc5+ Kxa7 34. Nxe8 Nxf4 White mates in five moves: 35.Rc7+ Kb6 36.Rb1+ Ka5 37.Rc2 etc. 1–0

Position: a8 black rook, b8 black knight, d8 black queen, f8 black rook, g8 black king, f7 black pawn, g7 black pawn, a6 black pawn, d6 black bishop, e6 black bishop, f6 black knight, h6 black pawn, b5 black pawn, d5 black pawn, e5 white knight, a4 white bishop, c4 black pawn, d4 white pawn, f4 white pawn, h4 white bishop, c3 white knight, a2 white pawn, b2 white pawn, c2 white pawn, d2 white queen, g2 white pawn, h2 white pawn, c1 white king, d1 white rook, h1 white rook

Position after 13...b5

In the following game, Leonard nonchalantly allows Black to trap his bishop, then launches a blistering attack:

Leonard vs. Perrin, place and date unknown
1. e4 e5 2. Nf3 Nf6 3. Bc4 Nxe4 4. Nc3 Nf6 5. Nxe5 d5 6. Bb3 Bd6 7. d4 0-0 8. Bg5 h6 9. Bh4 Be6 10. f4 c5 11. Qd2 c4 12. Ba4 a6 13. 0-0-0 b5 (diagram) 14. f5 Bxf5 15. Rdf1 Bh7 16. Rxf6 gxf6 17. Nxd5 Bxe5 18. dxe5 Nd7 19. Qxh6 "and White wins".
