= Lenny Ureña Valerio =

Historian of Poland

- Born: 1977 (age 48–49); Dominican Republic
- Awards: Distinguished Dissertation Award in Polish Studies (PIASA); Kulczycki Book Prize in Polish Studies

Academic background
- Education: University of Puerto Rico; University of Michigan
- Thesis: The stakes of empire (2010)
- Academic advisors: Geoff Eley; Brian Porter-Szucs

Academic work
- Discipline: History
- Sub-discipline: Polish history
- School or tradition: The cultural turn and postcolonialism
- Institutions: University of New Mexico
- Notable works: Colonial Fantasies, Imperial Realities
- Website: Lenny A. Ureña Valerio publications on Academia.edu

Lenny Ureña Valerio (born 1977) is a Puerto Rican scholar of colonial and Polish history, who works at the University of New Mexico.

== Biography ==
Ureña Valerio was born in the Dominican Republic and moved to Puerto Rico at the age of 9. She studied as an undergraduate at the University of Puerto Rico before gaining a doctorate at the University of Michigan. She has described her personal experience of immigration and her simultaneously changing identity, from a White Dominican to Puerto Rican and then a person of color, as having shaped her interest in postcolonialism and subaltern studies.

=== Research ===
Ureña Valerio's interest in Polish colonial history began as a doctoral researcher. In order to undertake research on the topic she taught herself both German and Polish. Her doctoral project would eventually lead to the publication of her 2021 monograph Colonial Fantasies, Imperial Realities. In the book Valerio explored the relationship between German imperialism in Africa and Poland. Her arguments contributed to the 'Windhoek to Auschwitz thesis', relating to the Boomerang effect of colonialism, first put forth by the historian Jürgen Zimmerer. Ureña Valerio's monograph was praised as an innovative contribution, although it also received criticism for oversimplifying Polish perspectives through the lens of national identity.

In 2020 Ureña Valerio was the recipient of the Kulczycki Book Prize in Polish Studies, awarded by the Association for Slavic, East European, and Eurasian Studies, for Colonial Fantasies, Imperial Realities.
