= Mick Leonard (Australian footballer) =

Australian rules footballer

Personal information
- Full name: Michael Thomas Leonard
- Born: 2 December 1914; Rosebery, Victoria
- Died: 23 May 1984 (aged 69); Parkville, Victoria
- Original team: Coburg
- Height: 175 cm (5 ft 9 in)
- Weight: 77 kg (170 lb)

Playing career^{1}
Years	Club	Games (Goals)
1938–1940	South Melbourne	27 (9)
- ^{1} Playing statistics correct to the end of 1940.

Michael Thomas Leonard (2 December 1914 – 23 May 1984) was an Australian rules footballer who played with South Melbourne in the Victorian Football League (VFL).
