= Leonard Taylor (football manager) =

American professional soccer coach

Personal information
- Place of birth: United States

Managerial career
- Years: Team
- 2008: Saint Kitts and Nevis

Leonard Taylor is an American professional soccer coach who coached the Saint Kitts and Nevis national football team from January to February 2008.
