= Len A. Pennacchio =

American molecular biologist

Len A. Pennacchio is an American molecular biologist, the head of the Genetic Analysis Program and the Genomic Technologies Program at the Joint Genome Institute in Walnut Creek, California.

Pennacchio did his undergraduate studies at Sonoma State University and then went on to graduate studies at Stanford University, receiving a Ph.D. in genetics in 1998. He became a research scientist at the Lawrence Berkeley National Laboratory in 1999, and joined the Joint Genome Institute in 2003. He retains his Lawrence Berkeley affiliation as well.

Pennacchio contributed to the Human Genome Project with an analysis of human chromosome 16. His research has also explored gene regulation, the genetic basis of differences in body shape between different individuals, conserved sequences in the genome, and connections between junk DNA and heart disease.

In 2008, Genome Technology magazine named him as one of 30 promising young researchers in their annual "Tomorrow's PIs" edition.
