= Len Phillips (footballer, born 1890) =

Australian rules footballer (1890–1968)

Personal information
- Full name: Leonard Vincent Phillips
- Born: 14 April 1890; Healesville, Victoria
- Died: 13 August 1968 (aged 78); Surfers Paradise, Queensland
- Original team: Healesville Football Club
- Height: 171 cm (5 ft 7 in)
- Weight: 67 kg (148 lb)

Playing career^{1}
Years	Club	Games (Goals)
1912–13	Melbourne City (VFA)	30 (12)
1914	St Kilda	5 (6)
1914	Brighton (VFA)	5 (4)
1915–17	West Perth (WAFL)	
1918	Essendon	4 (0)
1919	Footscray (VFA)	12 (7)
1922	Hawthorn (VFA)	1 (0)
- ^{1} Playing statistics correct to the end of 1922.

Leonard Vincent Phillips (14 April 1890 – 13 August 1968) was an Australian rules footballer who played with St Kilda and Essendon in the Victorian Football League (VFL).

== Family ==
The son of Thomas Joseph Phillips (1861-1951), and Barbara Phillips (1870-1937), née Lindupp, Leonard Vincent Phillips was born at Healesville, Victoria on 14 April 1890.

He married Doris Maude Hynam (1895-1988) on 26 April 1921.

== Football ==
=== Essendon (VFL) ===
On 10 August 1918, Phillips, a fast, skilful rover, and a printer by trade, played the last of his nine senior VFL matches for Essendon, having played his first VFL match for St Kilda in 1914.

=== Seven Clubs ===
Phillips, recruited from the Healesville Football Club in 1912, played for Melbourne City Football Club (VFA) 1912–1913, Brighton Football Club (VFA) 1914, St Kilda Football Club (VFL) 1914, West Perth Football Club (WAFL) 1915–1917, Essendon Football Club (VFL) 1918, Footscray Football Club (VFA) 1919, and Hawthorn Football Club (VFA) 1922; consequently, he has the unusual distinction of playing senior football with seven clubs, six of them in Melbourne, over eleven consecutive seasons (1912–1922).

== Death ==
He died at Surfers Paradise, Queenslandon 13 August 1968.
