= Leonardo Grandini =

Brazilian politician (born 2002)

- Grandini in 2026

Member of the Legislative Assembly of São Paulo
- Incumbent
- Assumed office 1 February 2027

Personal details
- Born: 10 June 2002 (age 24)
- Party: Workers' Party (since 2026)

Leonardo dos Reis Adorno Becker Grandini (born 10 June 2002) is a Brazilian politician who was elected member of the Legislative Assembly of São Paulo in 2026. He previously worked as a presenter and political commentator on the Jovem Pan Morning Show until 2022.
