= Ralph Lenney =

English footballer

Personal information
- Full name: Ralph Curry Lenney
- Date of birth: 11 January 1895
- Place of birth: South Shields, England
- Date of death: 10 November 1971 (aged 76)
- Place of death: Cleadon, England
- Position: Forward

Senior career*
Years	Team	Apps	(Gls)
- Hebburn Colliery Club
1922–1923	West Bromwich Albion	0	(0)
1923–1924	Wrexham	15	(1)
1924	Carlisle United		
- * Club domestic league appearances and goals

Ralph Curry Lenney (11 January 1895 – 10 November 1971) was an English footballer who played as a forward. During his career, he played professionally for West Bromwich Albion, Wrexham and Carlisle United.
