= Sonny Leonard =

American businessman (1943–2021)

- Born: Estol Fletcher Leonard; June 19, 1943; Gladys, VA
- Died: January 10, 2021 (aged 77); Lynchburg General Hospital Lynchburg, VA
- Other names: Sonny
- Occupations: Owner and operator of Sonny's Automotive Racing
- Years active: 52
- Known for: Designing and building large displacement racing engines
- Notable work: First 16,387 cc (1,000.0 cu in) V8 street racing engine

Sonny Leonard (June 19, 1943 – January 10, 2021) was an American businessman and the CEO of Sonny's Automotive Racing, a company he founded in January 1969. Leonard was known for designing and building large engine displacement drag racing V8 engines. Leonard's engines have won numerous national and global records and championships on land and sea. In 2012 Sonny Leonard developed a big block engine over 16,387 cc (1,000.0 cu in).

== Achievements (selection) ==
Sonny Leonard was specialized in creating American V8 engines of 9,832 cc (600.0 cu in) up to 16,387 cc (1,000.0 cu in).

- 16,482 cc (1,005.8 cu in), big block engine
- 15,404 cc (940.0 cu in), big block engine
- 13,142 cc (802.0 cu in), big block engine
- 11,926 cc (727.8 cu in), hemispherical combustion chamber engine
- 11,028 cc (673.0 cu in), Ford Hemi big block

== History ==
After turning his hobby into a business, Sonny Leonard opened a garage in 1968 in a 27.87 m^{2} (300.0 sq ft) building in Madison Heights, Virginia. In 1987, Leonard made history with Bill Kuhlmann, who drove Sonny's 615 cubic inch engine to the first speed of 200 mph in history with a full-bodied car. In 2013 Sonny Leonard became a partner for the 2013 season in the X-treme Drag Racing League (X-DRL). Sonnys Racing Engines celebrated its 50th anniversary in 2018. In 2019 Sonny Leonard built a second engine to raise funds for Victory Junction. In the same year he led John Montecalvo to the PDRA Pro Stock Championship. Sonny Leonard died on Sunday, January 10, 2021.
