= Herbert Beukes =

South African journalist and diplomat

Herbert Beukes (born c. 1942) is a South African journalist and diplomat. He served as the South African Ambassador to the United States.
