= Len Roberts (footballer) =

Australian rules footballer

Personal information
- Full name: Leonard Roberts
- Born: 4 July 1880; St Kilda, Victoria
- Died: 1 January 1949 (aged 68); Burwood, Victoria
- Original team: St Kilda Trades

Playing career^{1}
Years	Club	Games (Goals)
1906	St Kilda	1 (0)
- ^{1} Playing statistics correct to the end of 1906.

Len Roberts (4 July 1880 – 1 January 1949) was an Australian rules footballer who played with St Kilda in the Victorian Football League (VFL).

== Family ==
The son of William Roberts, and Martha Louisa Roberts, née Ball, Leonard Roberts was born in St Kilda, Victoria on 4 July 1880.

He married Florence Hilda Camm (1884–1965) in 1936.

== Football ==
In his only match for the St Kilda First XVIII, he played at centre half-back, in the match against Collingwood, at Victoria Park, on 28 July 1906.

== Death ==
He died (suddenly) at his residence in Burwood, Victoria on 1 January 1949.
