= Leendert =

Leendert is a Dutch given name. Notable people with this name include:

- Leendert van Beijeren (1619–1649), Dutch painter
- Leendert Bosch (1924–2017), Dutch biochemist
- Leen Buis (1906–1986), Dutch road cyclist, given name Leendert
- Leendert van der Cooghen (1632–1681), Dutch painter
- Leendert van Dis (born 1944), Dutch rower
- Leendert Antonie Donker (1899–1956), Dutch politician
- Leendert Ginjaar (1928–2003), Dutch politician
- Leendert Hasenbosch (c. 1695–c.1725), Dutch castaway
- Len Hoogerbrug (1929–2019), New Zealand architect
- Leendert Konijn (1899–1977), Dutch entrepreneur in Dutch East Indies
- Leendert Krol (born 1939), Dutch field hockey player
- Leendert de Koningh (1777–1849), Dutch painter
- Leendert de Lange (born 1972), Dutch politician
- Leendert van der Meulen (1937–2015), Dutch cyclist
- Leendert Pieter de Neufville (1729–1797), Dutch banker
- Leendert van Oosten (1884–1936), Dutch wrestler
- Leendert Rojer, Curaçaoan politician
- Leendert Saarloos (1884–1969), Dutch dog breeder
- Leendert Viervant the Younger (1752–1801), Dutch architect and cabinet builder
- Leendert van der Vlugt (1894–1936), Dutch architect

== See also ==
- Leonard
- Leenders
