= Elizabeth Weeks Leonard =

American lawyer

Elizabeth Weeks Leonard is an American lawyer, who is currently the J. Alton Hosch Professor at University of Georgia.
