= Elizabeth Leonard (politician) =

American politician (1935–1992)

Member of the Connecticut House of Representatives from the 111th district
- In office 1977–1981
- Preceded by: Herbert V. Camp
- Succeeded by: Martha Rothman

Personal details
- Born: July 25, 1935 Queens Village, New York, U.S.
- Died: July 13, 1992 (aged 56) Ridgefield, Connecticut, U.S.
- Party: Republican

Elizabeth "Liz" Leonard (July 25, 1935 – July 13, 1992) was an American politician who served in the Connecticut House of Representatives from 1977 to 1981, representing the 111th district.

Leonard died of lung cancer in Ridgefield, Connecticut, on July 13, 1992. She was 56.
