= Len Peterson (footballer) =

Australian rules footballer

Personal information
- Full name: Len Peterson
- Born: 30 June 1946 (age 80)
- Original team: University High School Old Boys
- Height: 178 cm (5 ft 10 in)
- Weight: 73 kg (161 lb)

Playing career^{1}
Years	Club	Games (Goals)
1967–68	North Melbourne	8 (0)
- ^{1} Playing statistics correct to the end of 1968.

Len Peterson (born 30 June 1946) is a former Australian rules footballer who played with North Melbourne in the Victorian Football League (VFL). He is one of three brothers who all played for North Melbourne including Robert and Viv Peterson.
