= Leo Beukeboom =

Dutch painter

Leonardus (Leo) Petrus Beukeboom (1943 – 3 December 2017) was a signpainter and lettering artist from De Pijp, Amsterdam perhaps best known for his krulletters ("curly letters") that adorn the city's bruin cafes ("brown cafes") throughout the central neighborhoods of the Jordaan, de Pijp, and Nieuwe Zijde. Beukeboom was originally trained as a typographic compositor, holding both a diploma and certificate in layout from the Amsterdamse Grafische School. After completing his courses in 1962, Beukeboom worked trivial jobs until 1967 when he began working as a freelance signpainter, almost exclusively for the Amsterdam-based Heineken brewery which commissioned him to decorate cafes as a general advertising strategy, a collaboration that lasted until 1989. Beukeboom devoted over thirty years decorating cafes in the krulletters tradition, until 2001 when forced to retire for health reasons.

As a self-taught signpainter, Beukeboom was one of the few who have achieved artistic status in the typically "lesser and short-lived," almost extinct trade of signpainting. His most original creation may be his personal interpretation of the French Renaissance typographic model, Garamond. He died in December 2017.
