= Len Brown (footballer) =

Australian rules footballer, born 1910

Personal information
- Full name: Leonard Martin Brown
- Born: 2 November 1910; Stawell, Victoria
- Died: 8 August 1983 (aged 72); Blackburn South, Victoria
- Original team: Pomonal

Playing career^{1}
| Years | Club | Games (Goals) |
| 1934 | North Melbourne | 3 (0) |
- ^{1} Playing statistics correct to the end of 1934.

Leonard Martin Brown (2 November 1910 – 8 August 1983) was an Australian rules footballer who played with North Melbourne in the Victorian Football League (VFL).
