= Lon (name) =

Lon is a given name, nickname, stage name and surname. It may refer to:

== Given name, nickname or stage name ==
- Lon Bender (born 1959), American Oscar-winning sound editor, business executive and inventor
- Lon Borgerson (born 1950), Canadian politician
- Lonnie Lon Boyett (born 1953), American former National Football League player
- Lon Burnam (born 1953), American politician
- Leonidas Lon Chaney (1883–1930), American actor during the age of silent films
- Lon Chaney Jr. (1906–1973), stage name of American character actor Creighton Tull Chaney
- Lon Clark (1912–1998), American stage and radio actor
- Lon Milo DuQuette (born 1948), American writer, lecturer and occultist
- Lon Evans (1911–1992), American National Football League player
- Lon L. Fuller (1902–1978), American legal philosopher
- Lon Haldeman, American ultramarathon cyclist
- Lon Hanagan (1911–1999), physique photographer also known as "Lon of New York" or simply "Lon"
- William Ian Lon Hatherell (born 1930), Australian former rugby union player
- Lon Hinkle (born 1949), American golfer
- Lon Horiuchi (born 1954), accused FBI sniper in the Ruby Ridge shootings and the Waco standoff
- Lon Jourdet (1888–89 – 1959), head men's basketball coach for the University of Pennsylvania, credited with inventing an early version of the zone defense
- Alonzo Lon Knight (1853–1932), American Major League Baseball player and manager
- Lonnie Lon Kruger (born 1952), American college basketball head coach and former player and former National Basketball Association head coach
- Herbert Alonzo Lon McCallister (1923–2005), American actor
- Lon McEachern, poker analyst on The World Series of Poker
- Laurence Lon Myers (1858–1899), American world-record-setting runner
- Lon Oden (1863–1910), Texas Ranger of the American Old West
- Leonardus Lon Pennock (1945–2020), Dutch sculptor, environmental and monumental artist and photographer
- Alonzo Lon Poff (1870–1952), American film actor
- Lon A. Scott (1888–1931), American politician
- Lonnie Lon Simmons (1923–2015), American baseball and football broadcaster
- Alonzo Lon Stiner (1903–1985), American college football player and head coach
- Lon Tinkle (1906–1980), American historian, author, book critic and professor
- half of the Lon & Derrek Van Eaton American vocal and multi-instrumentalist duo
- Lawrence Lon Vest Stephens (1858–1923), American politician, 29th Governor of Missouri
- Lonnie Lon Warneke (1909–1976), American Major League Baseball pitcher
- Lon Williams (1890–1978), American pulp western writer

== Surname ==
- Alice Lon (1926–1981), singer and dancer on The Lawrence Welk Show
- Lon Nil (died 1970), Cambodian police commissioner, brother of Lon Nol
- Lon Nol (1913–1985), Cambodian politician, Prime Minister and Defence Minister of Cambodia
- Lon Non (1930-1975), Cambodian politician and soldier, brother of Lon Nol

== See also ==
- W. Lon Johnson (1882-1967), American politician
- Lonnie, a given name
