= Leonhard =

Leonhard is a German male given name and surname also used in other Germanic languages, as well as Estonian, sharing the same origin as English Leonard. Notable people with the name include:

== Given name ==
- Alfred Leonhard Maluma (1955–2021), Tanzanian Roman Catholic prelate
- Alfred Leonhard Tietz (1883–1941), German entrepreneur
- Anton Leonhard Franzen (1896–1968), German lawyer and Nazi politician
- Arne Leonhard Nilsen (1893–1957), Norwegian politician
- Artur Leonhard Kasterpalu (1897–1942), Estonian politician
- Benedikt Maria Leonhard von Werkmeister (1745–1823), German Roman Catholic theologian
- Diederich Franz Leonhard von Schlechtendal (1794–1866), German botanist
- Dieterich Leonhard Oskamp (1756–1803), Dutch natural historian and author
- Friedrich Georg Leonhard Miedke (1803–1842), German actor, singer, composer, theatre director, painter and author
- Fritz Leonhard Redlich (1892–1978) was a German businessman and economic historian
- Hans Leonhard Schäufelein (c. 1480–1540), German painter and woodcuts designer
- Heinrich Leonhards Skuja (1892–1972), Latvian botanist
- Johann Leonhard Dober (1706–1766), German missionary
- Johan Leonhard Fix (1735–1807), German-Danish merchant and colonial governor
- Johann Leonhard Frisch (1666–1743), German linguist, entomologist and ornithologist
- Johann Leonhard Hug (1765–1846), German Roman Catholic theologian, orientalist and biblical scholar
- Johann Leonhard Pfaff (1775–1848), German Roman Catholic prelate
- Johann Leonhard Raab (1825–1899), German printmaker and painter
- Johann Leonhard Rost (1688–1727), German astronomer and author
- Karl Dietrich Leonhard Engel (1824–1913), German musician and author
- Karl Leonhard Reinhold (1757–1823), Austrian philosopher
- Leonhard Adelt (1881–1945), German translator and author
- Leonhard Agtstein (fl. 1472–1491), Swiss compositor
- Leonhard Baldner (1612–1694), Strasbourg German fisherman and naturalist
- Leonhard Baumeister (1904–1972), German politician
- Leonhard Beck (c. 1480–1542), German painter and woodcuts designer
- Leonhard Blasius (died 1644), Danish architect
- Leonhard Graf von Blumenthal (1810–1900), officer of the Prussian Army and the Imperial German Army
- Leonhard von Call (1767–1815), Austrian composer and virtuoso
- Leonhard Christian Borchgrevink Holmboe (1802–1887), Norwegian Lutheran minister and politician
- Leonhard Deininger (1910–2002), German politician
- Leonhard Dientzenhofer (1660–1707), German builder and architect
- Leonhard Drach (1903–1996), German jurist and convicted war criminal
- Leonhard von Eck (1480–1550), Chancellor of Bavaria
- Leonhard Ennen (1820–1880), German Roman Catholic theologian, historian and archivist
- Leonhard Euler (1707–1783), Swiss mathematician and physicist
- Leonhard Frank (1882–1961), German author
- Leonhard Fredrik Rääf (1786–1872), Swedish folklorist, historian and politician
- Leonhard Fronsperger (c. 1520–1575), German soldier and author
- Leonhart Fuchs (1501–1566), German physician and botanist
- Leonhard Gall (1884–1952), German architect
- Leonhard Gey (1838–1894), German history painter and art professor
- Leonhard Grill, Austrian experimental physicist and academic
- Leonhard of Gorizia (1440–1500), Count of Gorizia/Görz
- Leonhard Haas (born 1982), German retired footballer
- Leonhard Haeger (1867–1977), American architect
- Leonhard Harding (born 1936) German historian and scholar in African studies
- Leonhard Haskel (1872–1923), German actor and drama teacher
- Leonhard Helmschrott (1921–2011), German journalist and politician
- Leonhard von Hohenhausen (1788–1872), German military and war minister
- Leonhard Hutter (1563–1616), German Lutheran theologian
- Leonhard Käär (1904–1963), Estonian politician
- Leonhard Kaiser (1480–1527), German Lutheran theologian and reformer
- Leonhard Kass (1911–1985), Estonian footballer
- Leonhard Kaufmann (born 1989), Austrian footballer
- Leonhard Kaupisch (1878–1945), German general
- Leonhard von Keutschach (c. 1442–1519), Prince-Archbishop of Salzburg
- Leonhard Kleber (c. 1495–1556), German organist and composer
- Leonhard Koeppe (1884–1969), German ophthalmologist
- Leonhard Kohl von Kohlenegg (1834–1875), Austrian actor and author
- Leonhard Kubizek (born 1963), Austrian musician and director
- Leonhard Kukk (1906–1941) Estonian weightlifter
- Leonhard von Laiming (1381–1451), German Roman Catholic prelate
- Leonhard Lapin (1947–2022), Estonian architect, artist, historian and poet
- Leonhard Lechner (c. 1553–1606), German composer, kapellmeister, tenor and music editor
- Leonhard Ludwig Finke (1747–1837), German physician
- Leonhard Machu (1909–1967), Austrian footballer
- Leonhard Mahlein (1921–1985), German trade unionist
- Leonhard Merzin (1934–1990), Estonian actor
- Leonhard Münst (born 2002), German footballer
- Leonhard Nagenrauft (1938–2017), German luger
- Leonhard Päminger (1495–1567), Austrian-German Lutheran theologian, poet and composer
- Leonhard Pföderl (born 1993), German ice hockey player
- Leonhard Pohl (1929–2014), German athlete
- Léonhard Quaglia (1896–1961), French ice hockey player and speed skater
- Leonhard Ragaz (1868–1945), Swiss Reformed theologian
- Leonhard Rauwolf (1535–1596), German physician and botanist
- Leonhard Reichartinger (died 1396), German Crusader
- Leonhard Romeis (1854–1904), German architect
- Leonhard Schiemer (c. 1500–1528), German Anabaptist author and martyr
- Leonhard Schmitz (1807–1890), Prussian-British classical scholar and author
- Leonhard Schröter (c. 1532– c. 1601), German Renaissance choirmaster, teacher and composer
- Leonhard Schultze-Jena (1872–1955), German explorer, zoologist and anthropologist
- Leonhard Seiderer (1895–1940), German footballer
- Leonhard Seppala (1877–1967), Norwegian-Kven-American sled dog breeder, trainer and musher
- Leonhard Sohncke (1842–1897), German mathematician, physicist and mineralogist
- Leonhard von Spengel (1803–1880), German classical scholar
- Leonhard Stejneger (1851–1943), Norwegian-American ornithologist, herpetologist and zoologist
- Leonhard Stock (born 1958), Austrian alpine ski racer
- Leonhard von Stryk (1834–1882), a Baltic German historian and author
- Leonhard Thurneysser (1531–c. 1595), Swiss-German scholar and miracle doctor
- Leonhard Tietz (1849–1914), German entrepreneur and art collector
- Leonhard Vahter (1896–1983), Estonian politician
- Leonhard Viljus (1904–1970), Estonian sport shooter
- Leonhard Wächter (1762–1837), German historian and author
- Leonhard Waitl (1939–2010), German ice hockey player
- Leonhard Weiß (1907–1981), German footballer
- Leonhard Wilhelm Johann Neuman (1885–1933), Estonian musician, choir director, singer and diplomat
- Peter Leonhard Braun (born 1929), German author and radio producer
- Peter Leonhard Gianelli (1767–1807), Danish medallist and sculptor

== Surname ==
- Charles Leonhard (1915–2002), American music educator and academic
- Daniel Leonhard (born 1972), German sports shooter
- Dave Leonhard (born 1941), American baseball player
- Elke Leonhard (1949–2025), German politician
- Florian Leonhard (born 1963), German-British violin maker and restorer
- Gerd Leonhard, German futurist, speaker and author
- Glenn Leonhard (born 1954), Canadian footballer
- Gottfried Leonhard (1895–1983), German politician
- Gustav von Leonhard (1816–1878), German mineralogist and geologist
- Jim Leonhard (born 1982), American football coach and former player
- Jörn Leonhard (born 1967), German historian and professor
- Karl Leonhard (1904–1988), German psychiatrist
- Karl Cäsar von Leonhard (1779–1862), German mineralogist and geologist
- Melanie Leonhard (born 1977), German historian and politician
- Rudolf Leonhard (1889–1953), German author and communist activist
- Wolfgang Leonhard (1921–2014), German author and historian

== See also ==
- Leonard § Variations
- Leonard (disambiguation)
- Sankt Leonhard (disambiguation)
