= Johan Carl Krauss =

German-born professor of medicine and botanist

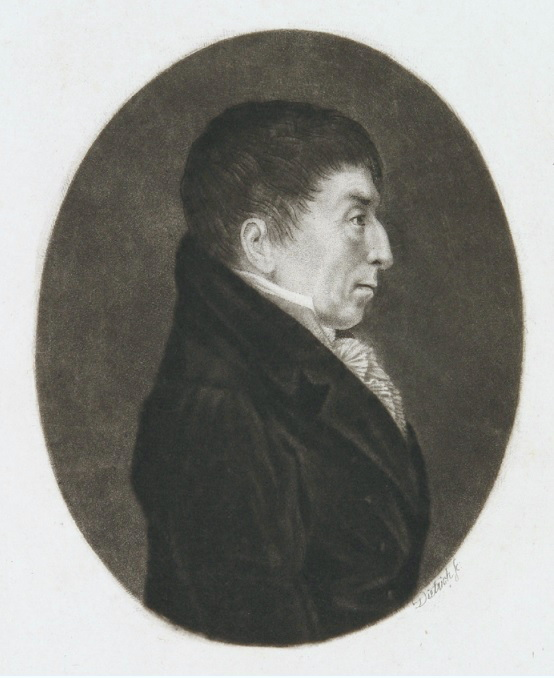
Johan Carl Krauss

Johan Carl Krauss (6 October 1759 in Öhringen – 19 March 1826 in Leiden), was a German-born professor of medicine at Leiden, botanist, taxonomist and author of botanical books. He was the son of Christophorus Adam Krauss, a physician at the court of Prince Hohenlohe, and Dorothea Zolner. He is best known for his publication "Afbeeldingen der fraaiste, meest uitheemsche boomen en heesters".

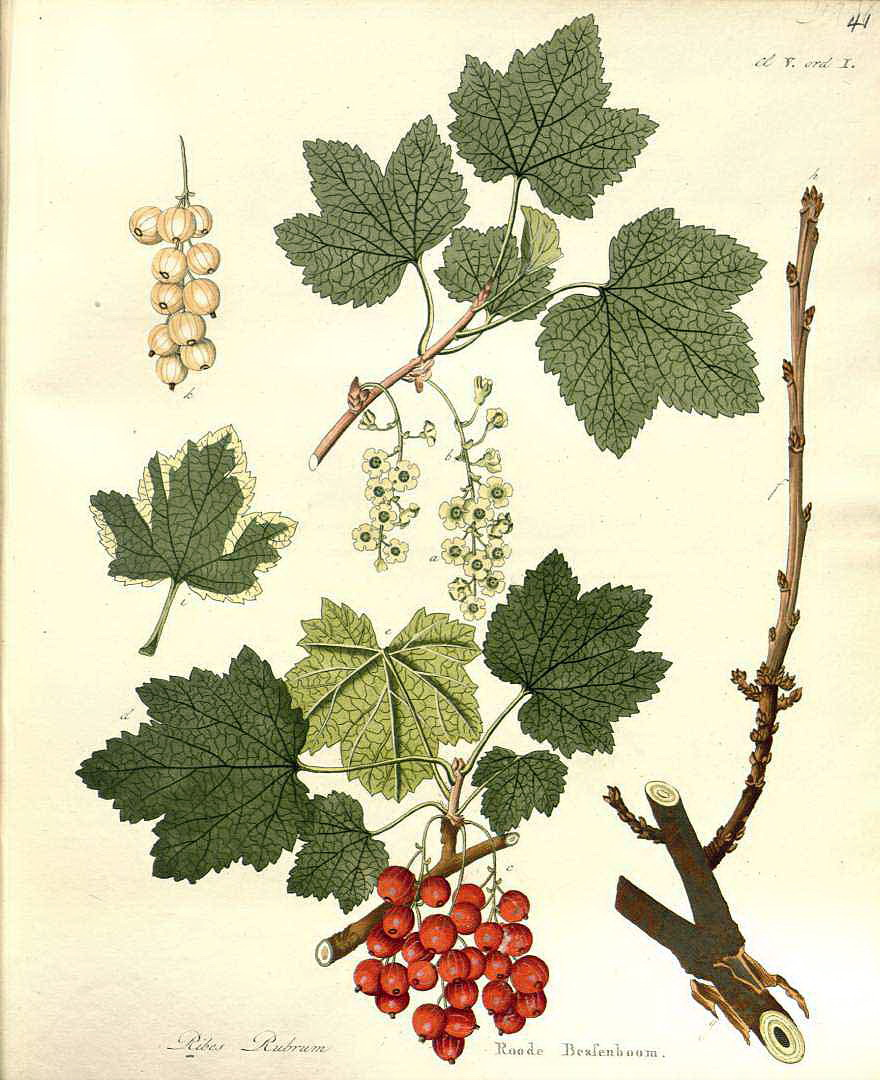
Ribes rubrum

After initial tuition by his father, Johan served for a period as soldier and later resumed his studies in Erlangen and Stratsbourg, and upon completing these was appointed as physician to the Baden troops, who were stationed in Holland at the time. Accordingly, he found himself in Harderwijk where in 1795 he graduated at the University of Harderwijk with his thesis 'De praecipuis militum morbis eorumque causis' (On the chief military diseases and their causes). After a short stay in Arnhem, he settled as physician in Amsterdam in 1787, marrying Everdina Hey shortly thereafter. In May 1807 he was appointed as professor of theoretical, practical and forensic medicine at Harderwijk, and the following year held an 'Oratio de medicina systematica, eiusque usu ac abusu' (An oration on systematic medicine, and its use and abuse). In June 1810 he stepped down as rector and presented 'De perscrutatione mentis humanae maximum medico faciente emolumentum' (the investigation of the human mind, the greatest contribution made by the physician), in which he urges physicians to practise therapy.

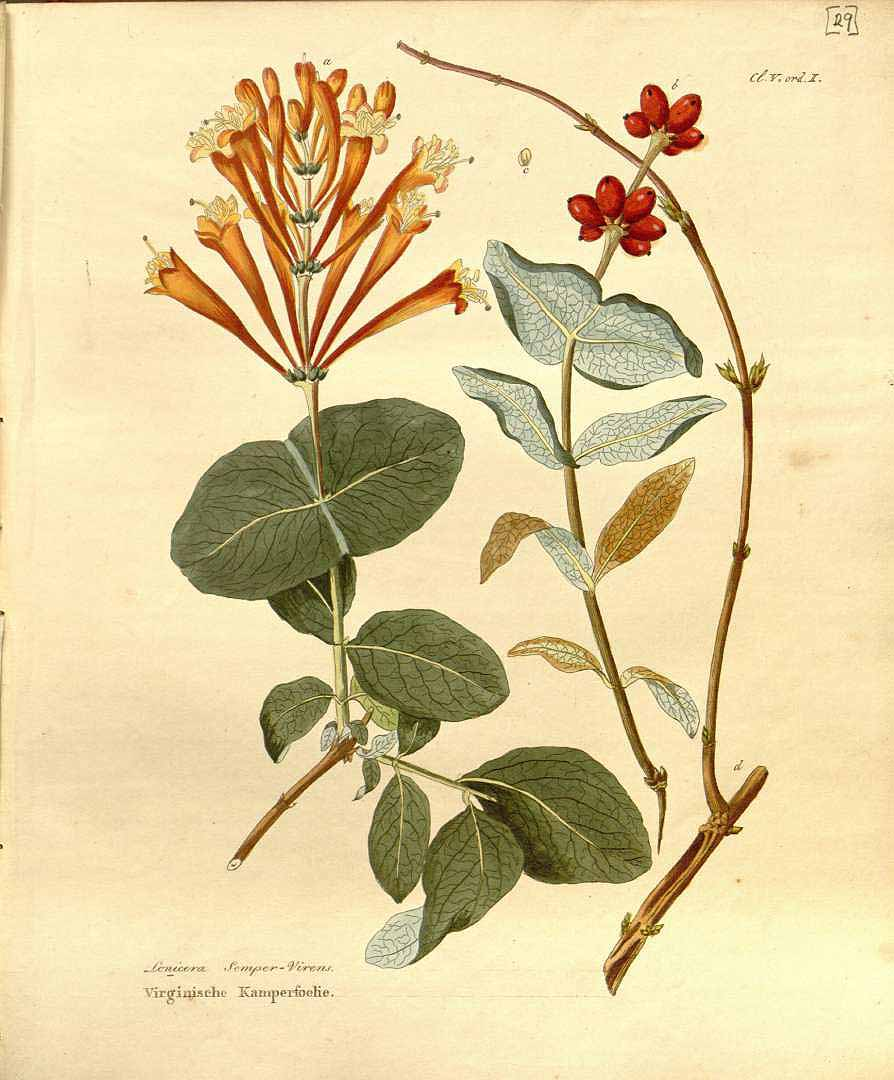
Lonicera sempervirens

In 1806 Krauss was elected a correspondent, living in the Netherlands, of the Royal Institute of the Netherlands.

== Bibliography ==
The standard author abbreviation Krauss is used to indicate this person as the author when citing a botanical name.

- Afbeeldingen der artseny-gewassen met derzelver Nederduitsche en Latynsche beschryvinge, appeared in seven parts, from 1796 to 1813, and was published by J.C. Sepp en Zoon (Amsterdam)

The series was an adaptation of Icones Plantarum Medicinalium, Abbildungen der Arzenygewächsen (1784–1790) by the German apothecary and botanist Johannes Zorn (1739–1799):
part I (1796) was prepared by Dieterich Leonhard Oskamp (1756–1802);
part II (1796) by Martinus Houttuyn (1720–1798);
parts III (1798), IV (1800), V (1800) en VI (1801) by Johan Carl Krauss;
part VII (1813) was later added by Adolphus Ypey (1749–1820).
