= Hoyos (surname) =

Hoyos is a surname. Notable people with the surname include:

- Albertoyos (born 1969), Spanish illustrator
- Alexander, Count of Hoyos (1876–1937), Austro-Hungarian diplomat
- Alfredo Castillero Hoyos, Panamanian political scientist
- Ana Mercedes Hoyos (1942–2014), Columbian artist
- Ángel Guillermo Hoyos (born 1963), Argentine footballer
- Arturo de Hoyos (1925–2016), Mexican-American university professor
- Bernardo Francisco de Hoyos de Seña (1711–1735), Spanish Roman Catholic priest
- Carlos Hoyos (born 1962), Colombian footballer
- Carlos Mauro Hoyos (1939–1988), Colombian jurist and politician
- Cristina Hoyos (born 1946), Spanish flamenco dancer
- Darío Castrillón Hoyos (1929–2018), Colombian cardinal of the Catholic Church
- Diana Hoyos (born 1985), Colombian actress and singer
- Douglas Hoyos (born 1990), Austrian politician
- Ernst Hoyos, German dressage trainer
- Ernst Karl von Hoyos-Sprinzenstein (1830–1903), Austrian landowner and politician
- Herbin Hoyos (1967–2021), Colombian journalist and broadcaster
- Jorge Martínez de Hoyos (1920–1997), Mexican actor
- Juan López de Hoyos (1511–1583), Spanish schoolmaster and author
- Ladislas de Hoyos (1939–2011), French TV journalist
- Lucas Hoyos (born 1989), Argentine footballer
- Lucía Hoyos (born 1975), Spanish actress, presenter and model
- Manuel León Hoyos (born 1989), Mexican chess Grandmaster
- Maria Elena Milagro de Hoyos (1909–1931), Cuban-American tuberculosis victim
- Mariano de Jesús Euse Hoyos (1845–1926), Colombian Roman Catholic priest
- Miguel Ángel Hoyos (born 1981), Bolivian footballer
- Ricardo Martínez de Hoyos (1918–2009), Mexican painter
- Rodolfo Hoyos Jr. (1916–1983), Mexican-American film and television actor
- Santiago Hoyos (born 1982), Argentine footballer
- Terri Hoyos (born 1952), Mexican-American actress
- Viviane Morales Hoyos (born 1962), Colombian politician

== See also ==
- Hoyos, municipality located in the province of Cáceres, Extremadura
- Hoyos del Espino, municipality located in the province of Ávila, Castile and León
- Hoyos del Collado, municipality located in the province of Ávila, Castile and León
- Duke of Almodóvar del Río
- House of Hoyos
- Palais Hoyos
- Rosenburg
- Rundersburg Castle
- Mayerling incident
