= Ferlo Desert =

Desert in Senegal

Coordinates: 15.88°N 15.25°W

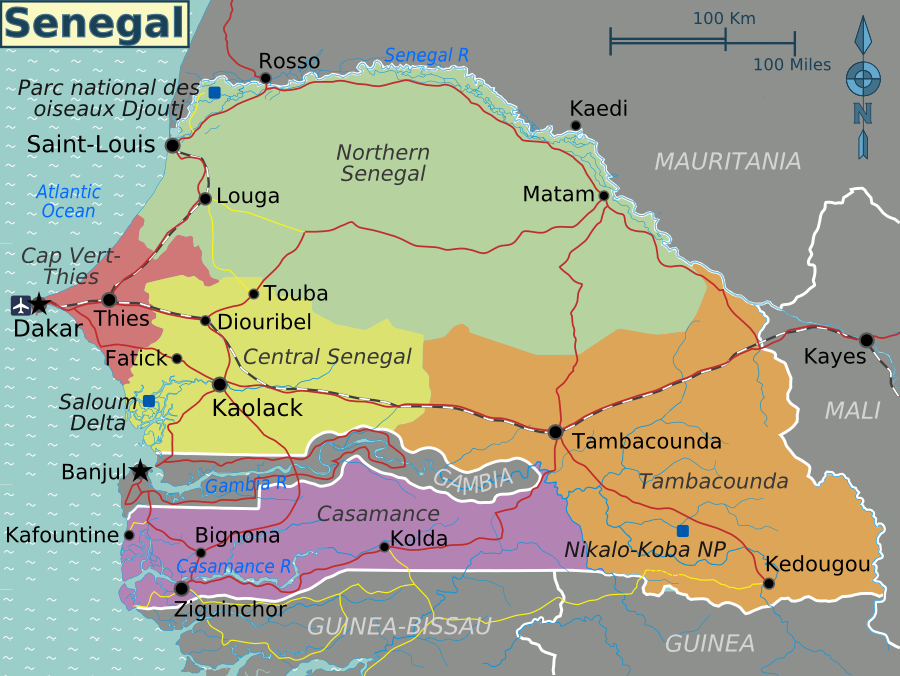
Senegal. The Senegal River defines the northern border. The Ferlo desert covers most of Northern Senegal, including the Matam region and eastern Saint Louis and Louga regions

The Ferlo Desert, also known as the Ferio Desert, is a desert in northern-central Senegal. It is inhabited by the Serer and the Fulani.

== Geography and landscape ==
The Ferlo Desert occupies an area of some 70,000 km^{2}, over one-third of the country's total area. There are expansive plains and sand dunes, with scattered rocks and small valleys with clay soils in which small water bodies form. The plain is crossed by the courses of numerous tributaries of the Senegal River, which for most of the year are dry and fill with water only occasionally during the rainy season (July to September).

The climate is very dry, characterised by a long dry season (which lasts for nine months a year), with winds from the very dry Sahara Desert. The wet season, in the period from July to September, is short and brings irregular rainfall brought by the humid air masses from the Gulf of Guinea. Due to the arid climate the region is sparsely populated; the area was also plagued by drought in the early 1970s and again in 1983–1984. Linguère, with nearly 13,000 inhabitants, is the largest town in this region. Desertification has also contributed to a regional population decline.

The semi-desert zone of the Ferlo is known for its baobab trees. Leguminous plants such as Zornia glochidiata and Alysicarpus ovalifolius and Graminaceae such as Cenchrus biflorus, Dactyloctenium aegyptium, Chloris prieurii, Eragrotis tremula, Aristida mutabilis and Schonefeldia gracilis have been observed. The national reserves Ferlo Nord Wildlife Reserve (Réserve de faune du Ferlo Nord) (RFFN) and Ferlo Sud Wildlife Reserve (Réserve de faune du Ferlo Sud) (RFFS) lie within the Ferlo desert region. Ferlo Nord Wildlife Reserve, established in 1971, covers an area of 6,000 square kilometres (2,300 sq mi). Ferlo Sud Wildlife Reserve was established the following year, and is a little larger at 6,337 square kilometres (2,447 sq mi).

== Economy ==
This region of Senegal is destitute, and living conditions are difficult. The population are mainly engaged in ranching. The main crops cultivated are millet, cowpeas, peanuts, watermelons and squash and Acacia gum.

The natural grasslands of the desert have undergone change. Until the mid-1950s the region "was visited by people and livestock only during the rainy season and at the very beginning of the dry season (July to November)." In 1953, J. G. Adam noted that the "groundnut cultivation has transformed the natural vegetation on sandy soils, to note, even at a distance from the water points, a climax, subclimax vegetation which has not been disrupted by cultivation, and hardly changed by grazing, since this has occurred only, until recent years, during the four summer months, where the vegetation is dense and close to standing water." From the mid-1950s, boreholes were drilled and began to provide water to areas of the desert, which enabled pastureland to be used by the farmers all year round. By 1955, fifty wells were reported along the main trek routes to be providing water. Under better conditions, the population of livestock in the desert increased; by the 1990s, it supported livestock herding, cited as "a continuous extension of the desert steppe into the savanna" but one which was "not rich enough to attract herders from the north of the [Senegal] river." Between 1969 and 1972, the "Study of Natural Pastureland in Northern Senegal" was conducted, assessing the borehole development in the desert and found that the boreholes were still on average 25–30 km apart, which meant that exploitation of land was generally restricted to a 5 km radius of them. Spate irrigation has since developed in the region, and temporary ponds may cover an area of several hectares during the wet season from July to October.
