= St. Leonard =

St. Leonard may refer to:

- St. Leonard, Maryland, a census-designated place in Calvert County, Maryland, United States
- St. Leonards F.C., a semi-professional English football club based in Hastings, East Sussex

== See also ==
- St Leonard's, Edinburgh, a neighbourhood of south-central Edinburgh, Scotland, United Kingdom
- St Leonards-on-Sea, a town and seaside resort in the borough of Hastings in East Sussex, England
- Leonard of Noblac
- Saint Leonard (disambiguation)
- Leonhard (disambiguation)
- Sankt Leonhard (disambiguation)
- St. Leonhard (disambiguation)
- St Leonard's Church (disambiguation)
- St Leonards
