= St. Leonhard =

St. Leonhard may refer to:

- St. Leonhard (Graz), a district of the Austrian city of Graz
- St. Leonhard in Passeier, a comune and a village in the Passeier Valley in South Tyrol, northern Italy
- St. Leonhard, Frankfurt, a parish of the Roman Catholic Church in Frankfurt, Hesse, Germany
- St. Leonhard am Forst, a town in the district of Melk in the Austrian state of Lower Austria
- St. Leonhard am Hornerwald, a town in the district of Krems-Land in Lower Austria in Austria
- St. Leonhard station, a Nuremberg U-Bahn station

== See also ==
- Leonard of Noblac
- Leonhard (disambiguation)
- Sankt Leonhard (disambiguation)
- St. Leonard (disambiguation)
