= Kavilda stronghold =

Castles in Estonia

Coordinates: 58°20′38.86″N 26°21′41.79″E

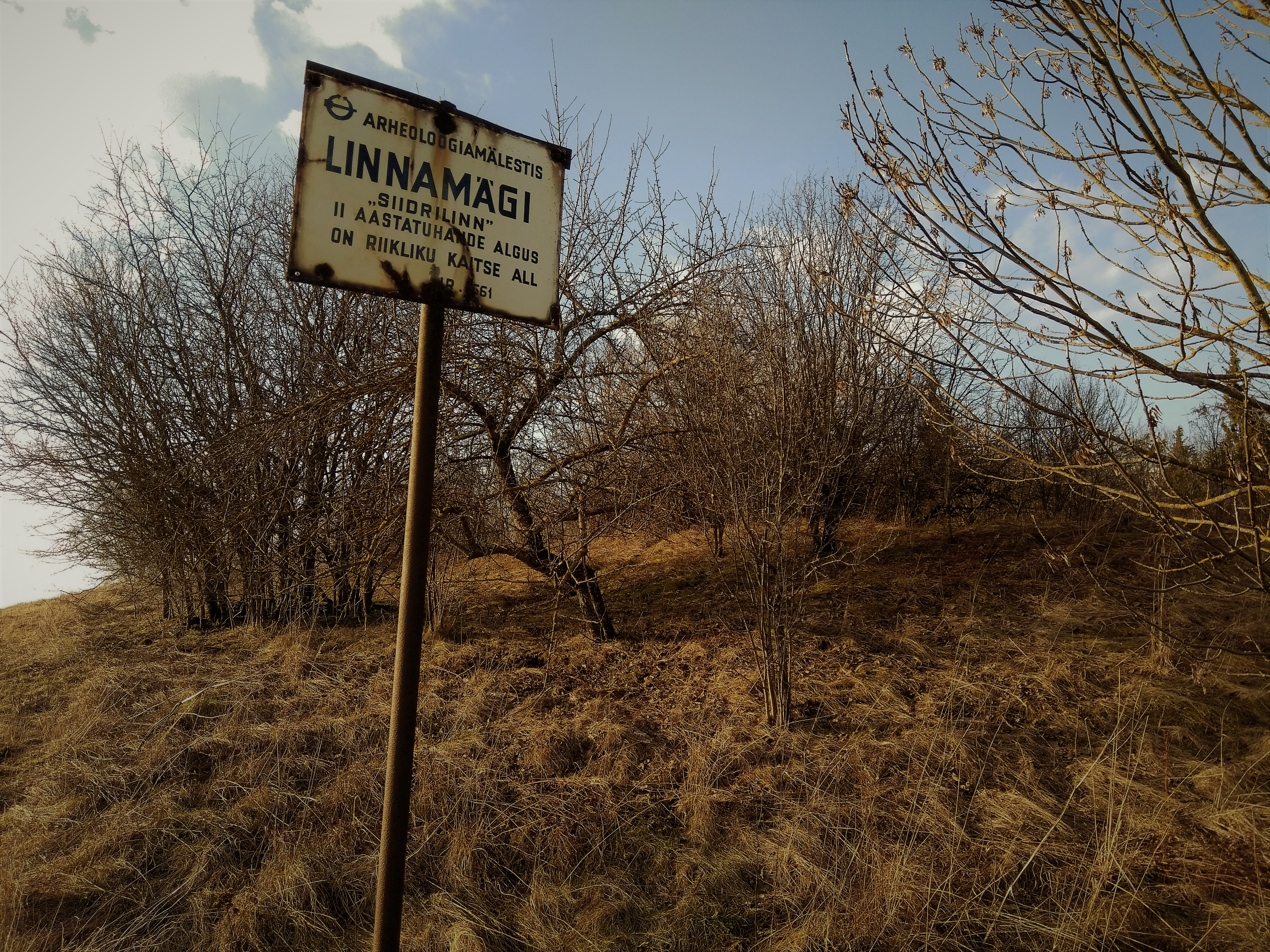
Kavilda stronghold

Kavilda stronghold (Estonian: Kavilda vasallilinnus, German: Kawelecht) was a castle in Tartu County, Estonia, on the western slope of the Kavilda River. Nowadays the site is located in Mõisanurme village, Elva Parish.

According to Leonhard von Stryk, the castle was first built in 1354 by Bartholomäus von Tiesenhausen. Other sources say it was built in 1361 by Arnold von Vietinghoff, the Master of Livonian Order.

The castle was destroyed during the Livonian War somewhere between 1564 and 1582. It was probably knocked down before the invasion of the Poles. Thereinafter Kavilda existed only as a manor but not as a castle.

The castel was a castellum-alike building with a tower-shaped residential building. Nowadays only one and a half floors have remained, most of it under the ground.
