= Hoyo =

Hoyo may refer to:

- Mount Hoyo, Congo
- Hōyo Strait & Hōyo Fortress, Japan
- Hoyo de Manzanares. Spanish municipality
- Hoyo Mulas, former name Buena Vista, Carolina, Puerto Rico
- Hoyo AC Elan, former name Verspah Oita football club
- José Azcona del Hoyo, former President of Honduras
- Dora del Hoyo, notable Spanish Catholic laywoman
- George DelHoyo, Uruguayan-born American actor
- Daniel Hoyo-Kowalski Polish footballer
- Hoyo de Monterrey, Cuban cigar brand
- El hoyo, lit. 'The Hole', 2019 Spanish dystopian thriller film
- MiHoYo, Chinese video game company
  - Hoyo-Mix, MiHoYo's musical group

== See also ==
- Hoyos (surname)
- Belén Hoyo Juliá, Spanish politician
