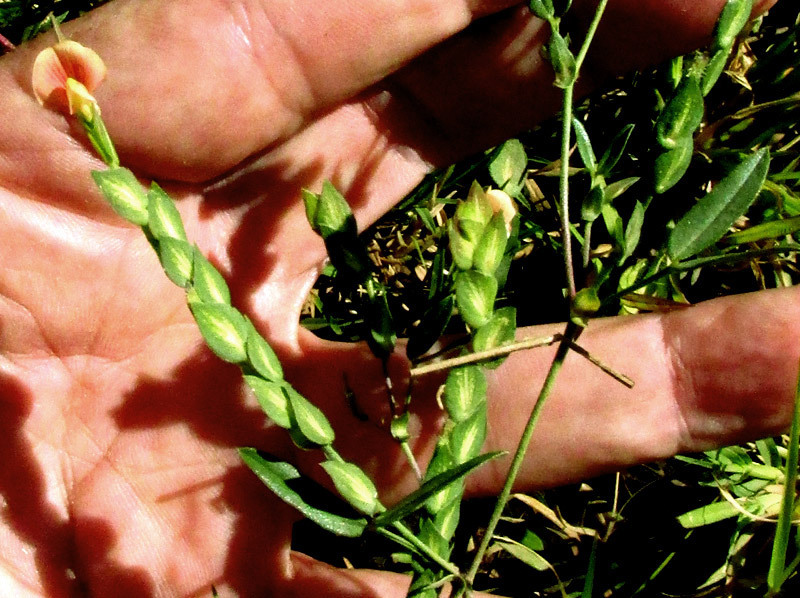
- flower and conspicuous inflorescence bracts
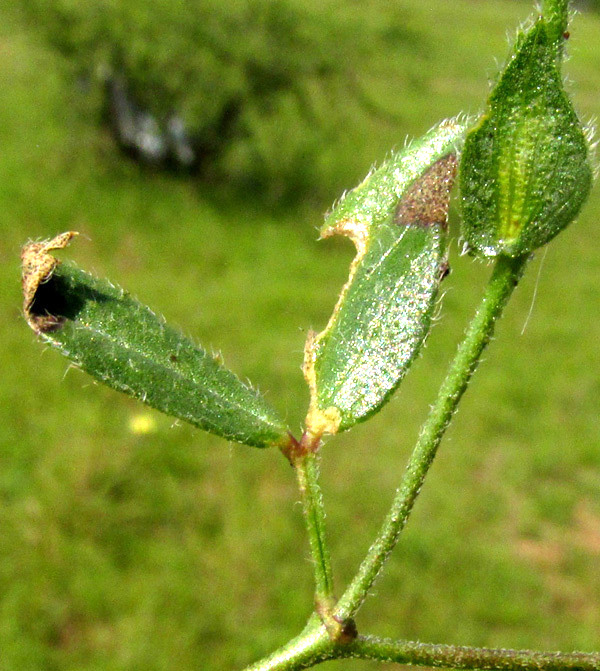
- leaf with two leaflets

Scientific classification
- Kingdom: Plantae
- Clade: Tracheophytes
- Clade: Angiosperms
- Clade: Eudicots
- Clade: Rosids
- Order: Fabales
- Family: Fabaceae
- Subfamily: Faboideae
- Genus: Zornia
- Species: Z. thymifolia

Binomial name
- Zornia thymifolia Kunth (1824)

Synonyms
- Zornia diphylla var. thymifolia (Kunth) Benth. (1859); Hedysarum clandestinum Willd. ex Steud. (1840)

= Zornia thymifolia =

Species of plant

Zornia thymifolia is a species of plant in the family Fabaceae.

== Description ==
Zornia thymifolia is a much-branched perennial with slender stems with or without hairs. Its compound leaves consist of only two leaflets, each leaflet slenderly egg-shaped and up to 1.5 cm (3/5 in) long.

Flowers are yellow with reddish stripes in the center. As is to be expected of a member of the Faboideae subfamily, they are papilionaceous in shape. The most striking feature of Zornia thymifolia is that beneath each flower there's a pair of green, egg-shaped but sharp-tipped, conspicuous bracts, each bract up to 10 mm (2/5 in). The bracts are flattened and press against one another, holding between them the base of the flower, or else protectively concealing the calyx with its developing ovary, after the flower's corolla has fallen off. The flowers with their bracts are arranged one above another on straight inflorescences, producing a distinctive and attractive pagoda effect. The legume-type fruits are somewhat flattened and generally develop four segments. They are yellowish or greenish, and usually hairless, though not always.

== Distribution ==
Zornia thymifolia occurs in the Mexican Plateau of central Mexico, plus there is a disjunct population distributed from Honduras south into Colombia.

== Habitat ==
In the central Mexican state of Querétaro Zornia thymifolia is described as inhabiting grassy areas and scrubland.

== Etymology ==
The genus Zornia was named in honor of the German pharmacist, botanist and botanical illustrator Johannes Zorn, who lived from 1739 to 1799.
