= Leonhard Drach =

German jurist

- Born: Leonhard Josef Hubert Drach; 9 March 1903; Aachen, Kingdom of Prussia, German Empire
- Died: 12 January 1996 (aged 92); Ludwigshafen, Germany
- Occupations: Regional public prosecutor Convicted war criminal
- Political party: NSDAP (1933-1945)

Leonhard Drach (9 March 1903 – 12 January 1996) was a German jurist and convicted war criminal.

His criminal conviction arose from his work as a government prosecutor in occupied Luxembourg during the early 1940s. He was pardoned in 1954 and made his way back into the legal service as a regional prosecutor in Frankenthal, Germany. However, in 1965 his Nazi past was raised in the press by a disgruntled party whom Drach had recently prosecuted, and a wider media storm ensued. Matters were raised which generated some painfully intense public soul searching, and Drach's application, at the age of 63, to take early retirement was accepted in 1966.

== Life ==
=== Early years ===
Leonhard Josef Hubert Drach was born and grew up in Aachen. He studied jurisprudence at Cologne and Bonn, qualifying in 1928 and taking a post as a Court Assessor in Aachen. Late in 1931 he moved on, becoming an assistant in the Prosecutor's Office at Trier, where in April 1933 he became a senior administrative assistant specialising in press and political crimes. Context for this appointment is provided by the régime change of January 1933, following which the new government lost little time in creating a one party dictatorship in Germany. It was also during 1933 that Drach joined the Nazi Party, the National Socialist Association of Legal Professionals (NSRB / Nationalsozialistischer Rechtswahrerbund) and the ruling party's paramilitary wing (SA), also becoming a sponsoring member of the SS. In 1934, following the conventional career path implicit in his previous year's promotion, he was appointed a district prosecutor in Trier. Between 1937 and 1940 he was simultaneously also employed by the Gau (regional) Law Office.

=== Luxembourg years ===
War was declared by major belligerents in September 1939 and in May 1940 the German army invaded Luxembourg, which marked the start of more than four years of military occupation for the Grand Duchy. In August 1940 Leonhard Drach was seconded to Luxembourg as a "Head of civil administration" ("Chef der Zivilverwaltung""), a role which after 1941 he combined with that of Senior District Prosecutor, based in Koblenz. In Luxembourg his position effectively made him the chief prosecutor at the newly created Special Court, and he worked on numerous criminal cases, frequently and successfully demanding the imposition of a death sentence. He was rewarded with the Cross of Merit (2nd class) for his "constructive work" ("Aufbauarbeit") and "fact based conduct of political criminal cases" ("sachliche Erledigung politischer Strafverfahren").

On 30 August 1942 a general strike was called in protest against the forcible recruitment of Luxembourg men into the German army. The Germans responded by arresting 20 suspected ringleaders. The suspects were taken before a hastily convened court martial, presided over by a regional Gestapo chief called Fritz Hartmann. Leonhard Drach's job was to prosecute the cases, and he demanded the death sentence for all 20 of the accused. On 14 September 1942 Drach received a note from Hartmann congratulating him for his part in the proceedings. The court had been persuaded. The men were executed (shot) at the Hinzert concentration camp, a short distance to the east.

In September 1944 US troops forced the Germans out of Luxembourg. The German administrative authorities took their files with them, to Trier, where the court clerk was instructed to light a bonfire in the courtyard outside the main court house. The files recording the legal history of Luxembourg under German occupation were thrown onto the flames from the window of his office by Chief Prosecutor Leonhard Drach.

=== Conviction ===
War ended, formally, in May 1945. Drach was interned in 1948/9 and taken back to Luxembourg to face justice. In 1949 he was sentenced to 15 years of forced labour in respect of his activities as prosecutor with the wartime Special Court, and at a further trial before the same court in 1951 he was sentenced to 20 years of forced labour under the terms of war crimes legislation. However, it was determined that the two sentences should be served simultaneously, and should be set at a total duration of only 15 years.

=== Clemency ===
At the end of 1954 the authorities in Luxembourg pardoned and released Leonhard Drach.

On his return from Luxembourg, Drach was accepted back into the Rhineland-Palatinate prosecution service. However, he was now working not in Koblenz but in the southern part of the state, based in Frankenthal (to the south of Worms). In 1960 he was promoted to the position of Chief District Prosecutor ("Oberstaatsanwalt") at Frankenthal.

=== The Nowack affair ===
In December 1961 the Frankenthal District Court handed down a 2,000 Mark fine and a suspended six-month jail sentence to Wilhelm Nowack after finding him guilty of misfeasance in a public office ("Untreue im Amt"). In October 1958 Dr. Nowack had resigned his office as regional Finance Minister of Rhineland-Palatinate. He was prosecuted for what might today be defined as a form of insider trading. He had reportedly acquired 20 shares in a company called "Schnellpressenfabrik Frankenthal AG", which was 75% state owned, and of which Nowack, as regional finance minister, was the ex-officio chairman. He had acquired his shares at a price equivalent to 120% of their par value. However, at around the same time the company had itself acquired shares from a private share holder at a price equivalent to 200% of their par value. The conclusion drawn by the prosecutor was that Nowack had acquired his shares for a price equivalent to only 60% of their "true" value, and that a corresponding loss had been suffered by the company. The total value at which Nowack had acquired his shares was a not insubstantial 216,000 Marks, implying a corresponding loss to the company of 144,000 Marks. It should be stressed that Nowack always maintained that he had done nothing wrong in acquiring shares at a discount to which, as an "employee" of the company, he was entitled. The state prosecutor in the case was the Frankenthal Chief District Prosecutor, Leonhard Drach.

The prosecutor then launched a second criminal case against Nowack, this time for alleged perjury. Nowack now armed himself with more written material from Luxembourg, including information provided by Victor Bodson who had been so critical of Drach at the time of his release from jail in Luxembourg back around Christmas 1954. Armed with supporting documentation, Nowack now wrote an open, and very angry, letter to the Frankfurter Neue Presse (newspaper). "That this notorious accomplice of Nazi terrorist-justice launches this prosecution against me is a matter of inestimable shamefulness" ("Man hat sich nicht entblödet ausgerechnet diesen notorischen Helfershelfer nationalsozialistischer Terrorjustiz zum Ankläger gegen mich zu machen."). That the justice system had "reinserted this Leon Drach into the [privileged] circle of judges and prosecutors as though nothing had happened was nothing short of the worst kind of dismissable cavalier conduct ("...diesen Leon Drach ... wieder in den Kreis ihrer Richter und Staatsanwälte eingereiht, so als ob nichts oder schlimmstenfalls ein pensionsfähiges 'Kavaliervergehen' vorläge"). Nowack concluded that he refused to be prosecuted by a war criminal ("Ich lehne es ab, mich von einem Kriegsverbrecher anklagen zu lassen"). It is entirely possible that Nowack had already accessed details on Drach's career in Luxembourg long before writing his open letter to the press, since Nowack's defence lawyer, Edmund Dondelinger, had also been convicted in a Luxembourg court in respect of events during the wartime occupation, and had indeed shared his pretrial detention with Drach in the later 1940s.

Responding to Nowack, the regional justice minister for Rhineland-Palatinate, Fritz Schneider, shared his opinion, accepting that Drach had been convicted of war crimes, but adding that Drach had only been implementing the law as it existed at the time. Because of this, there could really be no question of reproaching Drach with war crimes, which was why back in 1954 the tribunal reassessing his case in Luxembourg had concluded that Drach had acted in good faith ("im guten Glauben an die Rechtmäßigkeit seines Verhaltens"). Importantly, that meant that there had been no obvious reason why Drach should not be permitted resume his career as a regional law officer in Rhineland-Palatinate.

At Mainz there was more support for Drach in the regional parliament where, in an outburst characterised in Die Zeit as "painful" (peinlich), the ambitious new chairman of the large centre-right CDU (party) group blustered, "if we cannot manage to integrate the "Third Reich" generation into our democracy, there will never be a vibrant democracy" ("Wenn es nicht gelingt, die Generation, die einst das Dritte Reich getragen hat, in die Demokratie einzugliedern, wird es nie eine lebendige Demokratie geben"). Meanwhile, the (almost equally large) centre left SPD (party) group called for a committee of enquiry to clarify the connections and relationships in the Drach affair, and Dr.Kohl himself appeared to recant from his earlier certainty, suggesting that people such as Drach, who were particularly heavily burdened by their "wartime activities", should no longer be employed as state prosecutors or judges. The parliament's "Legal Affairs Committee" was mandated to look into the Drach affair.

There was no instant reaction to Schneider's interpretation from the Luxembourg government. However, on 9 January 1965 Luxembourg's Foreign Minister, Pierre Werner, countered that Drach was indeed a convicted war criminal. Schneider's attempt retrospectively to vindicate Drach "represented a completely false assessment of the inhuman persecution that had taken over in Luxembourg during the war" ("...stellt eine völlige Verkennung der unmenschlichen Verfolgungsmaßnahmen dar, die während des Krieges in Luxemburg ergriffen wurden"). Victor Bodson, who as Luxembourg's Minister of Justice back in 1954 had signed off on the release, expressed himself more pithily: "We chucked the muck over the Moselle" ("Wir haben den Dreck über die Mosel abgeschoben"). The Moselle is the river that divides Luxembourg from Germany. In a subsequent interview Bodson insisted that Drach's release had been purely a matter of clemency, born of human decency. There was nothing that Drach had done to deserve his early pardon. ( "[nur aus menschlichen Rücksichten] ... nicht, weil er es verdient hätte").

After the entire matter had been publicised, and following the launch of an investigation by regional parliamentary committee, Leonhard Drach's application for early retirement was accepted with effect from 30 April 1966. His name was included in Albert Norden's "Brown Book" in which the author "outed" approximately 1,800 members of the West German political and administrative establishment whom he claimed to have identified as former Nazis. As a very old man, when interviewed, Leonhard Drach maintained that he had only acted in accordance with the law ("Ich habe nur nach Recht und Gesetz gehandelt").
