= Wilhelm Nowack =

German politician (1897–1990)

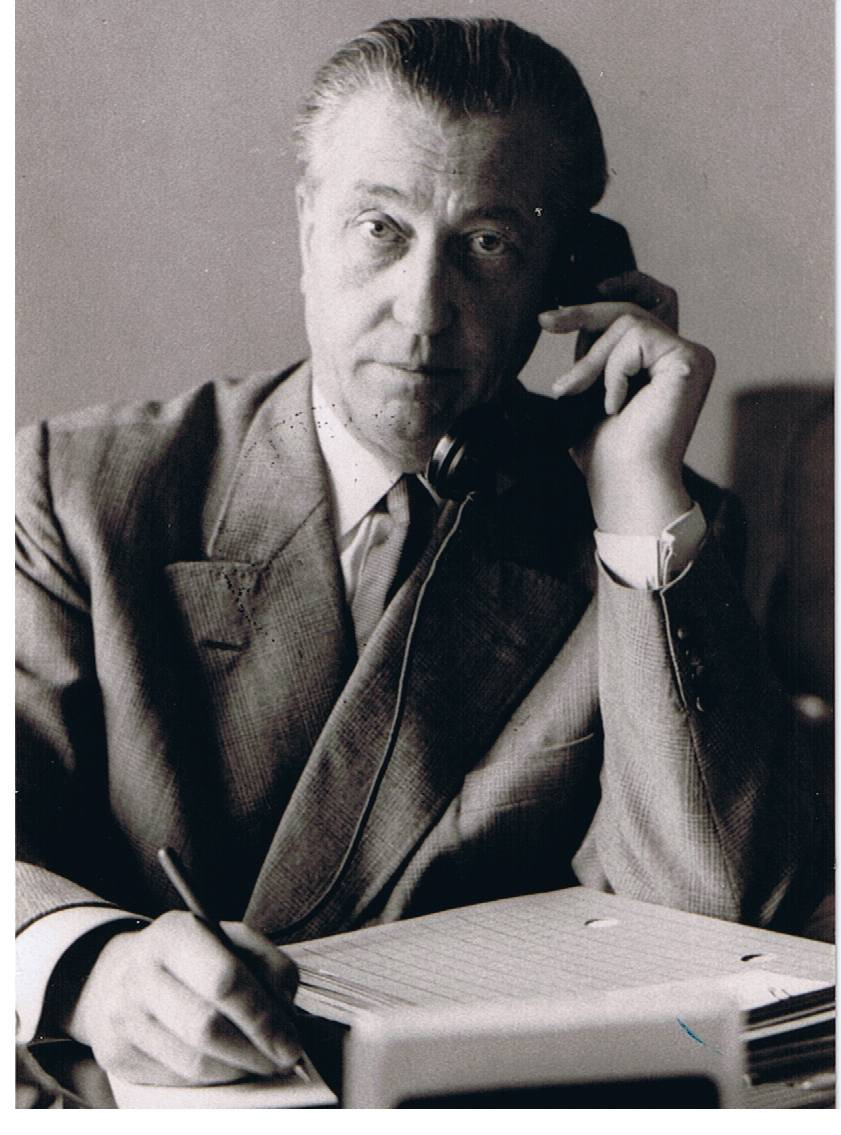
- Born: 28 August 1897; Altenburg, Saxe-Altenburg, German Empire
- Died: 31 July 1990 (aged 92); Feldafing (Starnberg), Bavaria, West Germany
- Education: Berlin; Innsbruck
- Occupations: Economist; Political Journalist; Broadcaster; Democracy activist Politician/Parliamentarian; State minister of Finance and Reconstruction
- Political party: DDP; DStP; FDP

Wilhelm Nowack (28 August 1897 – 31 July 1990) was a German economist who became a journalist and, more briefly, a radio producer. He was also politically engaged (DDP/DStP, FDP). A committed believer in democracy and supporter of the German republic, in 1924 he was a co-founder of the Reichsbanner Schwarz-Rot-Gold movement. Much later, between 1949 and 1952, he served as a member of the ”Bundestag” (West German parliament), based at that time in Bonn. In 1951 he accepted an appointment as State Minister for Finance and Reconstruction for Rhineland-Palatinate, and just over a year later he resigned his seat in the Bundestag.

== Life and career ==
Wilhelm Nowack was born at Altenburg, a small town at the eastern end of Thuringia in central-southern Germany After successfully completing his schooling he moved on to study Economics and Civil Law at the universities of Berlin and Innsbruck. It was at Innsbruck that in approximately 1920 he received his doctorate. His university studies had been interrupted by the war. Between 1914 and 1918 he served his country as a soldier.

Between 1920 and 1922 Nowack worked for the ”Technische Nothilfe ” ("Voluntary Emergency Response Service"), far to the west, in the industrialised Ruhr region, which was suffering particularly badly from the post-war austerity due, in part, to the importance of Ruhr coal deliveries in connection with the ambitious reparations package mandated by the French and their allies at Versailles. His move into journalism came almost by accident, as a result of a management position as “publishing director” which he briefly filled at the publishing business, “Die Hilfe ” during 1922/23. Between 1924 and 1929 he worked as Managing Editor on the “Illustrierte Reichsbanner-Zeitung”, a weekly illustrated magazine produced initially in Magdeburg and then, between 1926 and 1933, in Berlin. Circulation peaked in 1929 at slightly more than 100,000 copies. As an official publication produced for the Reichsbanner Schwarz-Rot-Gold, the “Illustrierte Reichsbanner-Zeitung” was clearly political in its objectives and republican in its sympathies. Republicanism, in the context of Germany in the 1920s, meant support for democratic government and rejection of the widespread hankering after a return to all the traditional pomp and values of the empire years between 1871 and 1918. It also meant rejection of the political extremism of left and Nazi Party which was becoming increasingly mainstream across western Europe, and especially in Germany, during the 1920s. After the Hitler government took power in January 1933 Nowak continued to work as a journalist on a freelance basis, contributing to a number of newspapers including the Frankfurter Zeitung, which somehow managed to survive until 1943.

After the war, which the region that would become the state of Rhineland-Palatinate under French military administration between May 1945 and May 1949, Nowack was initially employed as a radio editor. There is a reference to his having worked for the National Broadcasting Corporation between 1940 and 1945, and he continued to work in the broadcasting sector for some months, now based at Bad Ems in the extreme north of the region. He soon switched back to print media, however, teaming up with the buioding engineer Peter Josef Stein to found the Koblenz-based Rhein-Zeitung (refional newspaper): the first edition was printed towards the end of April 1946. He moved on after just one year, selling his share in the newspaper enterprise to Walter Twer, a businessman from nearby Nassau. During the later 1940s he also headed up the Economics Section at the office of the “Oberpräsident” (head administrator) of Koblenz, before moving on in 1947 to a top advisory position as an “Oberregierungsrat” with the Economics Ministry for the newly configured state of Rhineland-Palatinate.

== Politics ==
=== Pre-war activism ===
In 1924, during the republic years, Nowack was a co-founder of the Reichsbanner Schwarz-Rot-Gold movement, becoming its deputy chairman in the politically important Berlin-Brandenburg region. He also, as a young man, joined the Deutsche Demokratische Partei (German Democratic Party / DDP), a traditionalist centrist political party with roots in nineteenth century German liberalism. He stayed with the DDP after 1930 when the party rebranded and relaunched itself as the Deutsche Staatspartei in a desperate effort to dissuade voters, badly hit by the economic backwash from the Wall Street crash, from transferring their political support to populist politicians. However, during 1933 Germany transitioned to one-party dictatorship and political parties (with one exception) were banned and deprived of the right to operate legally. The Deutsche Staatspartei was dissolved on 28 June 1933, in anticipation of the "Law Against the Formation of Parties" of 14 July 1933. There is no indication that Wilhelm Nowack was involved in party politics between 1933 and 1945, but he was arrested on a number of occasions, apparently in connection with his activity as a freelance journalist.

After the war ended Nowack joined what became the Free Democratic Party (FDP), a new centrist political party committed to liberal social values and free-market economics. He later served as chairman of the party in Rhineland-Pfalz between 1953 and 1958. He was also a member of the FDP National Executive between 1954 and 1959 and deputy party chairman during 1955/56.

=== Parliamentarian ===
Wilhelm Nowack served – not without breaks – as a member of the Rhineland-Palatinate State Parliament between its inception in 1947 and his exclusion from it in 1958. He was elected to serve as leader of the FDP parliamentary group between 1948 and 1951.

Nowack served as a member of the ”Bundestag” (West German parliament) between 1949 and his resignation from it which took effect on 30 September 1952.

=== Ministerial office ===
On 13 June 1951 Wilhelm Nowack joined the co-alition Government of Rhineland-Palatinate as State Minister for Finance and Reconstruction, a post he retained until resigning from it on 11 November 1958. He was succeeded in the post by the lawyer-politician Hans Georg Dahlgrün, an emollient character who, importantly, was not formally a member of any political party, despite having served as a government official at the national Ministry of Finance between 1936 and 1945.

=== Early retirement ===
Nowack's sudden retirement from parliament and from ministerial office towards the end of 1958 came in connection with a criminal investigation which concluded, in December 1961, with a conviction, a 2,000 Mark fine and a six-month suspended (i.e. probationary) prison sentence. The affair concerned allegations of what would today, in an Anglo-American jurisdiction, be termed insider trading. The prosecutor then launched a second investigation involving allegations of perjury. The prosecutor was a man named Leonhard Drach who had been employed as a "Head of civil administration" in occupied Luxembourg during the early 1940s. After 1941 he had combined his administrative job with work as the Luxembourg state prosecutor. Following the war Dracht had faced justice in a Luxembourg court and been convicted in connection with his wartime activities, receiving both a fifteen-year term of forced labour and a twenty-year jail term (to be served simultaneously). Following a grant of clemency he had been released, however, and returned to Rhineland Palatinate where he had found his way back into the justice service. Nowack had been appalled by this development and had shared his opinion. The case was controversial and became more so as investigative journalists disclosed more details on the background. The increasingly unambiguous and widely shared reports from Luxembourg that Drach was a convicted war criminal gained traction, and in the end Leonhard Drach was also persuaded to take early retirement. The two men had at least two things in common. They both lived well beyond their ninetieth birthdays, and to their dying day, each man insisted that he had done nothing wrong.

== The affair of Prosecutor Drach ==
In October 1958 Dr. Nowack resigned his office as regional Finance Minister of Rhineland-Palatinate. According to detailed and well researched press reports he had purchased 20 shares in a company called "Schnellpressenfabrik Frankenthal AG", which was 75% state owned, and of which Nowack, was the ex-officio chairman by virtue of his ministerial office. He had acquired his shares at a price equivalent to 120% of their par value. At around the same time the company had itself acquired shares from a private investor at roughly 200% of their par value. The conclusion to be inferred was that Nowack had acquired his shares for only 60% of their theoretical "true" value, causing an equal and opposite loss to the company. The total value at which Nowack had acquired his shares was 216,000 Marks, implying a loss to the company of 144,000 Marks. Coalition partners and opposition groups in the Rhineland-Palatinate State Parliament had held back from any immediate response to press reports of the matter in June 1958, giving them time to check carefully the extent to which any parliamentary colleagues might be vulnerable to similar accusations, in the event of launching an attack in parliament and/or through the media against Nowack; but during the later summer of 1958 the state premier Peter Altmeier had come under increasing pressure to persuade Nowack to resign. Regardless of speculation in respect of possible criminal implications, Nowack had clearly acted unwisely in defiance of an avoidable conflict of interest, and he appears never to have denied having enriched himself through the transaction. It should be stressed that Nowack always maintained that he had done nothing wrong in acquiring shares at a discount to which, as an "employee" of the company, he was entitled. The state prosecutor in the criminal investigation which ebnsured was the Frankenthal Chief District Prosecutor, Leonhard Drach.

Following this success, the district state prosecutor launched a second criminal case against Nowack, this time for alleged perjury. Nowack fought back. He sought and obtained significant quantities of written material from Luxembourg, including information provided by Victor Bodson who had been highly critical of Drach at the time of his release from jail in Luxembourg back around Christmas 1954. The release had been an act of clemency on the part of the Luxembourg authorities, and Bodson simmered with anger that it had been taken by Drach and others in Germany as some form of indication that Drach had not been guilty as convicted. Armed with his files of additional information, Nowack wrote an open, and very angry, letter to the Frankfurter Neue Presse (newspaper). "That this notorious accomplice of Nazi terrorist-justice launches this prosecution against me is a matter of inestimable shamefulness" ("Man hat sich nicht entblödet ausgerechnet diesen notorischen Helfershelfer nationalsozialistischer Terrorjustiz zum Ankläger gegen mich zu machen."). It was intolerable that the justice system had "reinserted this Leon Drach into the [privileged] circle of judges and prosecutors as though nothing had happened to justify any sanction beyond, at worst, dismissal followed by reinstatement”. ("...diesen Leon Drach ... wieder in den Kreis ihrer Richter und Staatsanwälte eingereiht, so als ob nichts oder schlimmstenfalls ein pensionsfähiges 'Kavaliervergehen' vorläge"). Nowack thundered in his closing paragraph that he rejected prosecution by a war criminal ("Ich lehne es ab, mich von einem Kriegsverbrecher anklagen zu lassen"). It seems likely that Nowack had already accessed details on Drach's career in Luxembourg well before writing his open letter to the press, since his defence lawyer, Edmund Dondelinger, had also been convicted in a Luxembourg court in respect of events during the wartime occupation, and had indeed shared his pretrial detention with Drach in the later 1940s. Forced to react, the regional justice minister for Rhineland-Palatinate, Fritz Schneider, equivocated. He accepted that Drach had been convicted of war crimes, but then invoked the widely discredited (at that time) Nuremberg defence by stating that Drach had been implementing the law as he understood it at the time. Because of this, there could really be no question of reproaching Drach with war crimes, which was why back in 1954 the tribunal reassessing his case in Luxembourg had concluded that Drach had acted in good faith ("im guten Glauben an die Rechtmäßigkeit seines Verhaltens"). Importantly, that meant that there had been no obvious reason why Drach should not be permitted resume his career as a regional law officer in Rhineland-Palatinate.

At Mainz there was a final defiant outburst in support of Drach in the regional parliament. The newly appointed ambitious young leader of the centre-right CDU parliamentary group, Helmut Kohl, blustered, "if we cannot manage to integrate the "Third Reich" generation into our democracy, there will never be a vibrant democracy" ("Wenn es nicht gelingt, die Generation, die einst das Dritte Reich getragen hat, in die Demokratie einzugliedern, wird es nie eine lebendige Demokratie geben"). The normally restrained Hamburg weekly newspaper, Die Zeit characterised Kohl's parliamentary contribution as "painful" (peinlich). The second largest parliamentary group was that of the SPD (party). They called for a committee of enquiry to clarify the connections and relationships in the Drach affair. Dr.Kohl himself then appeared to recant from his earlier certainty, suggesting that people such as Drach, who were particularly heavily burdened by their "wartime activities", should no longer be employed as state prosecutors or judges. The parliament's "Legal Affairs Committee" was mandated to look into the Drach affair.

By the end of 1964 the Nowack Affair had evidently been successfully transformed into the Drach affair. From the country where the alleged war crimes had been performed there was silence until after the Christmas and New Year holidays. Then on 9 January 1965 Luxembourg's Foreign Minister, Pierre Werner, countered forcefully that Drach was indeed a convicted war criminal. Schneider's attempt retrospectively to vindicate Drach "represented a completely false assessment of the inhuman persecution that had taken over in Luxembourg during the war" ("...stellt eine völlige Verkennung der unmenschlichen Verfolgungsmaßnahmen dar, die während des Krieges in Luxemburg ergriffen wurden"). Victor Bodson, who as Luxembourg's Minister of Justice back in 1954 had signed off on the release, expressed himself more pithily: "We chucked the muck over the Moselle [across the border into Germany]" ("Wir haben den Dreck über die Mosel abgeschoben"). In a subsequent interview Bodson insisted that Drach's release had been purely a matter of clemency, born of human decency. There was nothing that Drach had done to deserve his early release. ( "[nur aus menschlichen Rücksichten] ... nicht, weil er es verdient hätte").

After the entire matter had been publicised, and following the launch of an investigation by regional parliamentary committee, Leonhard Drach's application for early retirement was accepted with effect from 30 April 1966. His name was included in Albert Norden's "Brown Book" in which the author "outed" approximately 1,800 members of the West German political and administrative establishment whom he claimed to have identified as former Nazis. As a very old man, when interviewed, Leonhard Drach was still maintaining that he had only acted in accordance with the law ("Ich habe nur nach Recht und Gesetz gehandelt").
