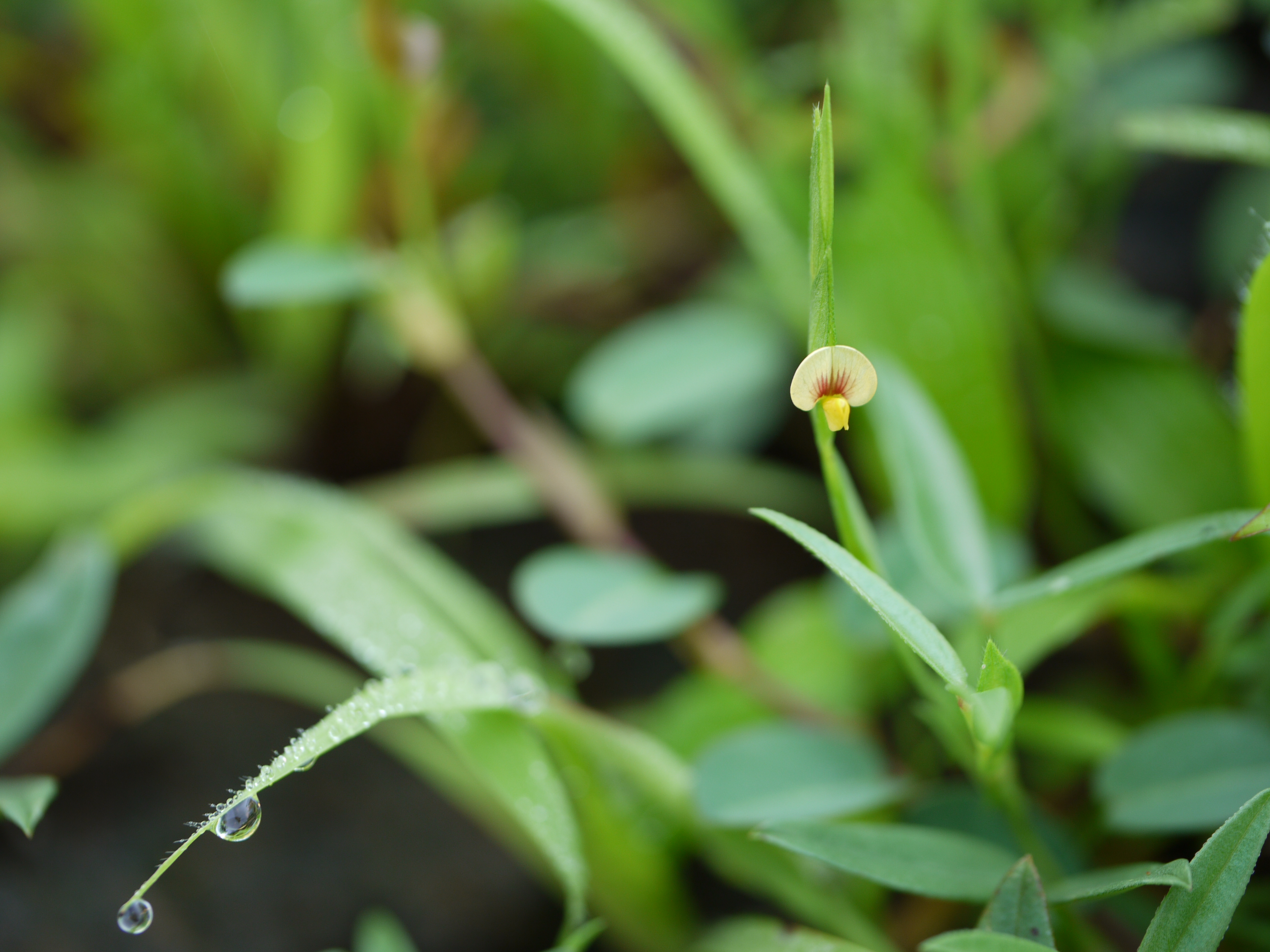

Scientific classification
- Kingdom: Plantae
- Clade: Tracheophytes
- Clade: Angiosperms
- Clade: Eudicots
- Clade: Rosids
- Order: Fabales
- Family: Fabaceae
- Subfamily: Faboideae
- Genus: Zornia
- Species: Z. gibbosa

Binomial name
- Zornia gibbosa Span.

Synonyms
- Zornia angustifolia Sm.; Zornia baliensis Mohlenbr.; Zornia cantoniensis Mohlenbr.; Zornia diphylla subsp. gibbosa Span.; Zornia diphylla var. angustifolia (Sm.) Baill.; Zornia gibbosa var. cantoniensis Mohlenbr.; Zornia graminea Span.

= Zornia gibbosa =

Species of legume

Zornia gibbosa is a small herb with 2-foliolate leaves and lance-shaped leaflets (up to 2.5 cm) marked with black glands. Its yellow flowers are enclosed in leafy bracts and borne in spikes of four. The pods are 3–6 jointed and densely prickly. It is native across a wide area of tropical and subtropical Asia, from Pakistan and India to Japan and New Guinea.

== Flowering and fruiting ==
The plant flowers and fruits between August and October, during the monsoon.

== Biochemical studies ==
A study of the powdered stem of Zornia gibbosa showed that it contains different types of enzymes, sugars, and plant compounds. The main chemical elements present are carbon, oxygen, hydrogen, and a small amount of nitrogen. Minerals such as calcium, potassium, sodium, and magnesium were also found. The stem contains lignin, starch, and a plant flavonoid called dihydroquercetin, along with tiny fiber structures (microfibrils).

== Uses ==
In traditional Indian medicine, the herb is used to treat dysentery, while the roots are given to children as a mild sedative. In many places it is considered as a weed.
