= Zornia glabra =

Scientific classification
- Kingdom: Plantae
- Clade: Tracheophytes
- Clade: Angiosperms
- Clade: Eudicots
- Clade: Rosids
- Order: Fabales
- Family: Fabaceae
- Subfamily: Faboideae
- Genus: Zornia
- Species: Z. glabra

Binomial name
- Zornia glabra Desvaux

Synonyms
- Zornia diphylla Zornia perforata

Species of legume

Zornia glabra is a herb species found in South America and native to French Guiana, Guyana, Suriname and Brazil.

It is well adapted to poor soils with low pH levels.
