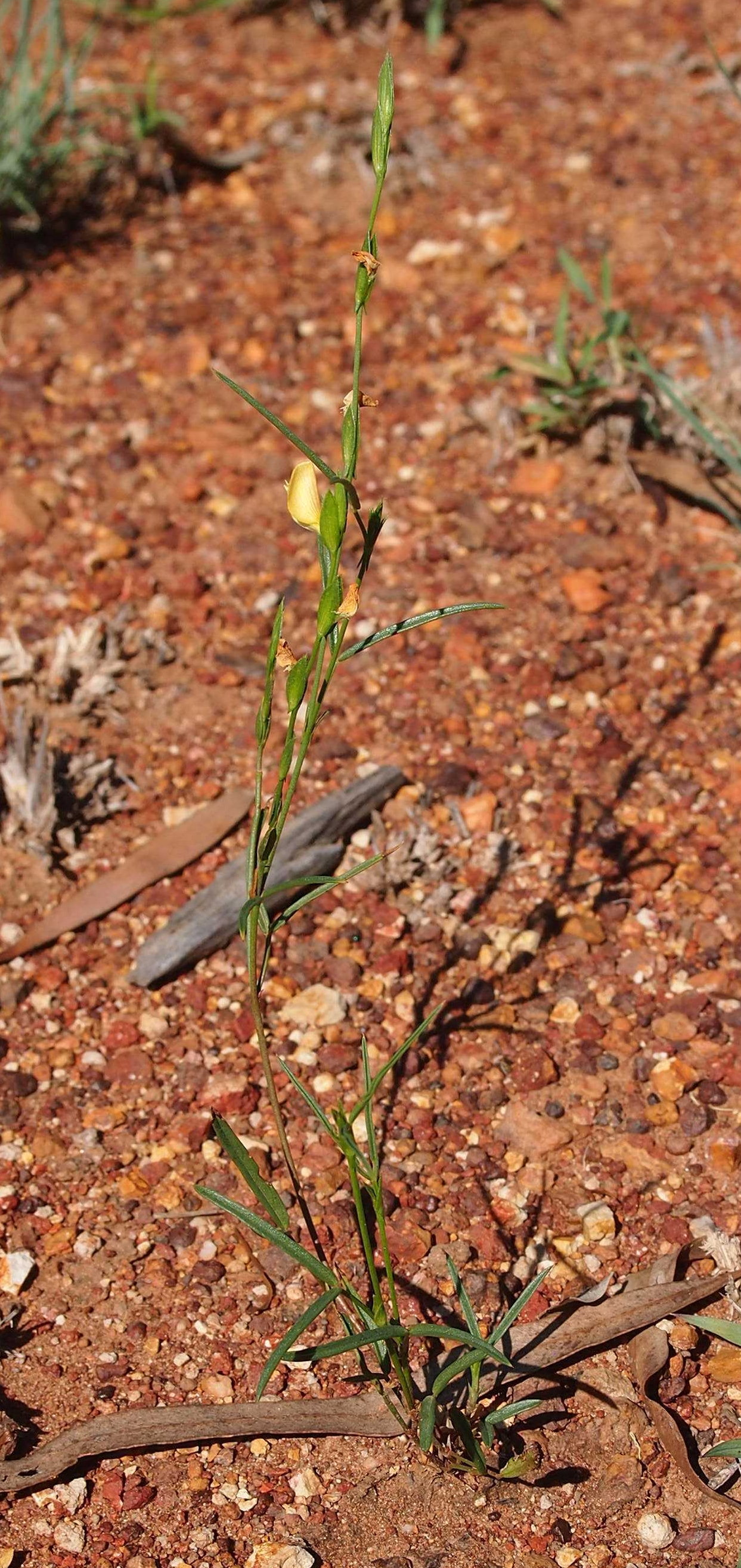

Scientific classification
- Kingdom: Plantae
- Clade: Tracheophytes
- Clade: Angiosperms
- Clade: Eudicots
- Clade: Rosids
- Order: Fabales
- Family: Fabaceae
- Subfamily: Faboideae
- Genus: Zornia
- Species: Z. dyctiocarpa

Binomial name
- Zornia dyctiocarpa DC.

= Zornia dyctiocarpa =

Species of legume

Zornia dyctiocarpa is a prostrate or decumbent perennial plant to 30 cm tall. The specific epithet dyctiocarpa is derived from the Greek language, and refers to the significantly veined pods. A widespread plant, found in grassland and open forest.
