= Zornia cearensis =

Scientific classification
- Kingdom: Plantae
- Clade: Tracheophytes
- Clade: Angiosperms
- Clade: Eudicots
- Clade: Rosids
- Order: Fabales
- Family: Fabaceae
- Subfamily: Faboideae
- Genus: Zornia
- Species: Z. cearensis

Binomial name
- Zornia cearensis Huber

Species of plant

Zornia cearensis is a poisonous plant. in the family Fabaceae.
