= Zornia vaughaniana =

Conservation status
- Critically Endangered (IUCN 2.3)

Scientific classification
- Kingdom: Plantae
- Clade: Tracheophytes
- Clade: Angiosperms
- Clade: Eudicots
- Clade: Rosids
- Order: Fabales
- Family: Fabaceae
- Subfamily: Faboideae
- Genus: Zornia
- Species: Z. vaughaniana

Binomial name
- Zornia vaughaniana Mohlenbr.

Species of legume

Zornia vaughaniana is a species of flowering plant in the family Fabaceae. It is found only in Mauritius. Its natural habitats are rocky shores and sandy shores.
