= Sankt Leonhard =

Sankt Leonhard may refer to the following places:

- in Austria:
  - Bad Sankt Leonhard im Lavanttal, in Carinthia
  - Sankt Leonhard im Pitztal, in Tyrol
  - Sankt Leonhard am Forst, in Lower Austria
  - Sankt Leonhard am Hornerwald, in Lower Austria
  - Sankt Leonhard bei Freistadt, in Upper Austria

== See also ==
- St. Leonhard (disambiguation)
