= Rundersburg Castle =

Ruined castle in Lower Austria

- Burg Rundersburg
- Sankt Leonhard am Hornerwald, Lower Austria in Austria
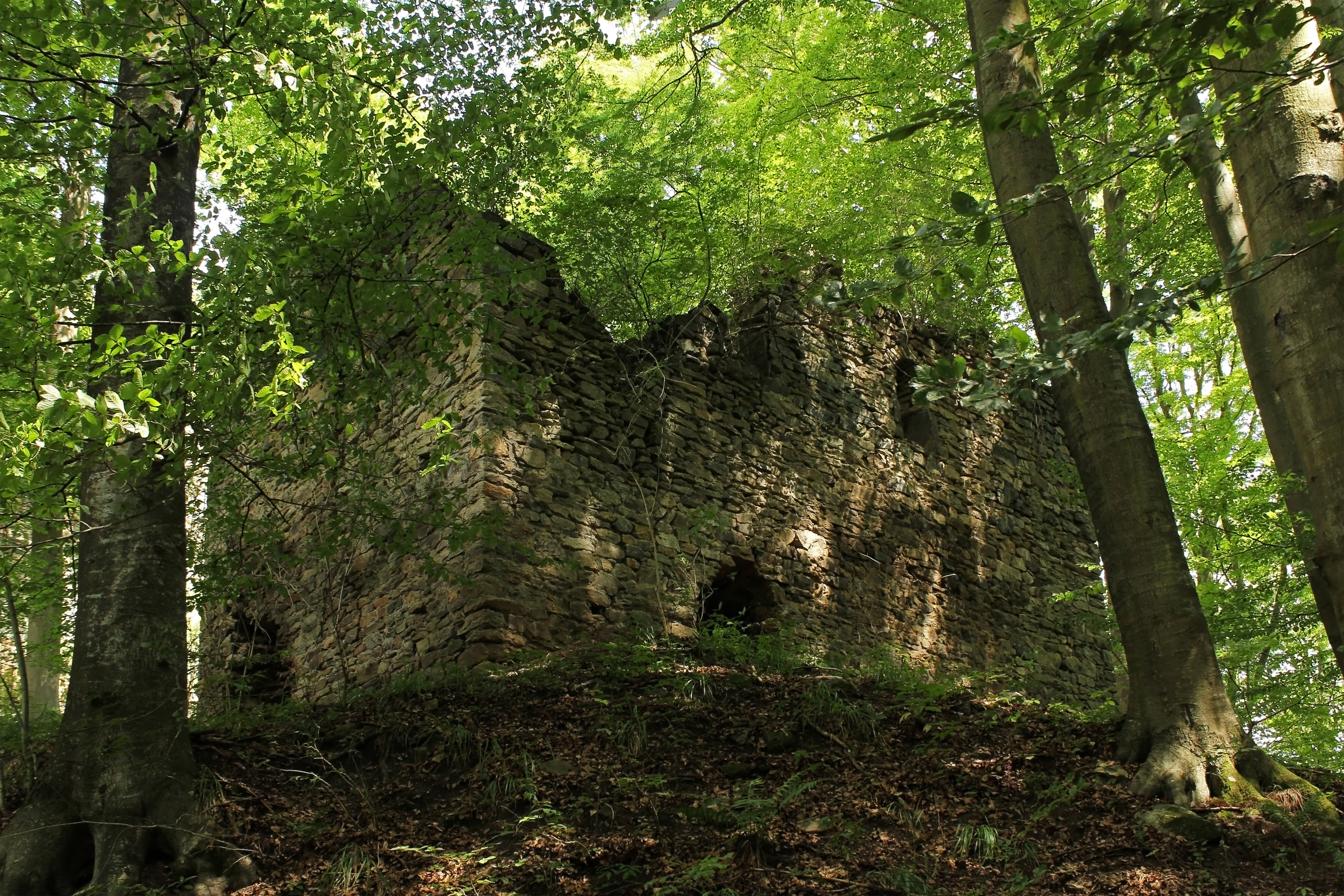

Site information
- Type: Castle
- Condition: Ruin

Location
- Coordinates: 48°36′46.6″N 15°30′33″E

Rundersburg Castle (German: Burg Rundersburg) is a ruined castle in Sankt Leonhard am Hornerwald, Lower Austria.

== History ==
The name of the castle was first mentioned in a deed of gift written in 1182 or 1189 which mentions Albero de Ronnenberc, a benefactor of Göttweig Abbey. The castle was used, along with the nearby Thurnberg and Idolsberg castles, to secure the Polansteig, a trade route running through the region. The lineage of the castle's owners probably died out with Ortolf von Roneberch in 1293, and it was acquired by the sovereign. In 1895 the castle and surrounding area was acquired by Rudolf Graf Hoyos-Sprinzenstein, a member of the Hoyos family. Today the castle is owned by Bernhard Hoyos, a descendant of Rudolf.

== Description ==
The castle was built above the Fronbach river valley. The opus spicatum wall structure dates the castle's construction to between 1180 and 1220. There was once a square residential tower in the center of the complex, but only one wall remains of it. This tower was probably built close to the middle of the 13th century.
