= Johannes Zorn =

German pharmacist and botanical illustrator

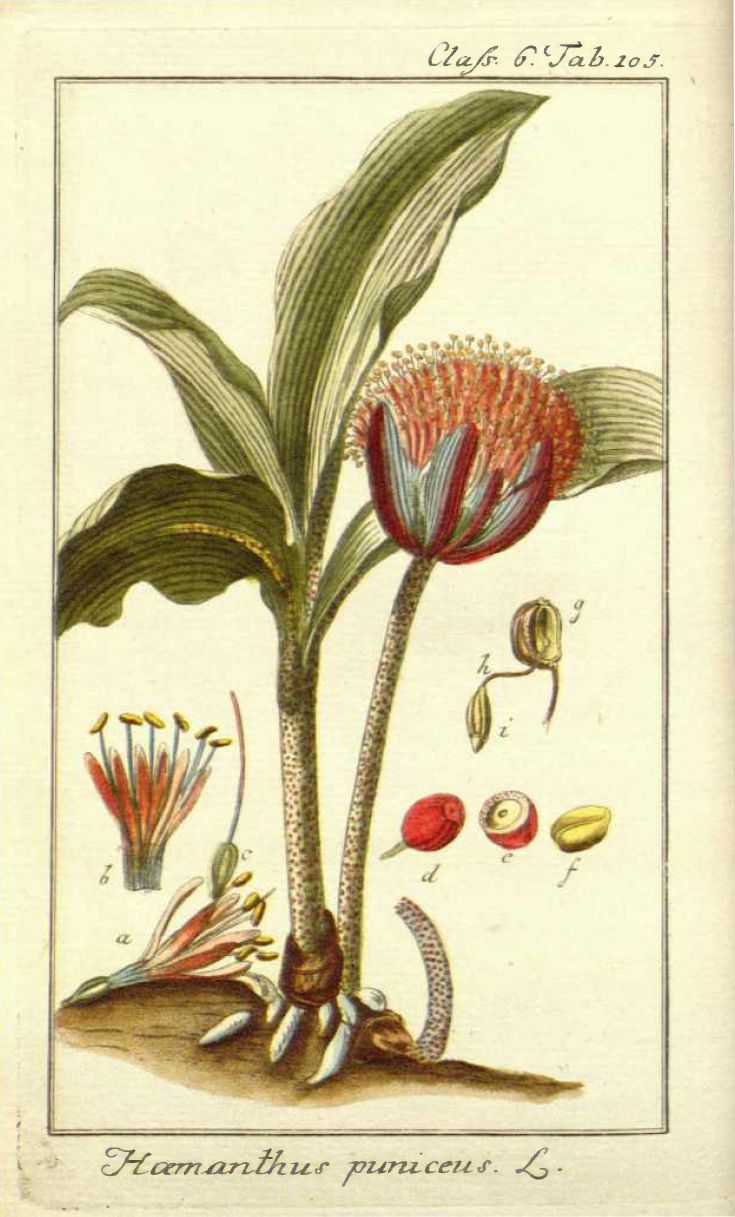
Scadoxus puniceus by Johannes Zorn

Johannes Zorn (1739 in Kempten – 1799) was a German pharmacist, botanist and botanical illustrator.

After his studies in pharmacy, Zorn became an apothecary in his hometown. He made extensive trips across Europe to collect medicinal plants, and between 1779 and 1790 published 6 volumes of "Icones plantarum medicinalium" in Nuremberg in which he illustrated and described over 600 medicinal plants. Later in 1796 this was published as the six-volume "Afbeeldingen der Artseny-Gewassen met Derzelver Nederduitsche en Latynsche Beschryvingen" in Amsterdam by J. C. Sepp & Zoon. It was illustrated by 600 handcoloured engraved plates, the Dutch text being from Martinus Houttuyn`s "Natuurlijke Historie". A rare 1813 supplement by Adolphus Ypey also contains 100 plates. A further supplement of 12 plates and 12 pages of text was published later.

He was passionate about the flora of the New World and published "Dreyhundert auserlesene amerikanische Gewachse" with 300 hand-coloured plates, the majority after Jacquin's "Selectarum Stirpium Americanarum Historia". Jacquin was associated with the gardens of Schoenbrunn as a result of being deputed by the emperor Francis I to gather exotic plants from America for cultivating in the palace grounds. Hundreds of plants from the Caribbean found their way to the palace and led to the publishing in 1763 of Jacquin's edition which was beautifully illustrated, but prohibitively expensive. Zorn's more affordable version shows hand-coloured plates smaller than the original engravings.

He is commemorated in the genus Zornia and is denoted by the author abbreviation Zorn when citing a botanical name.
