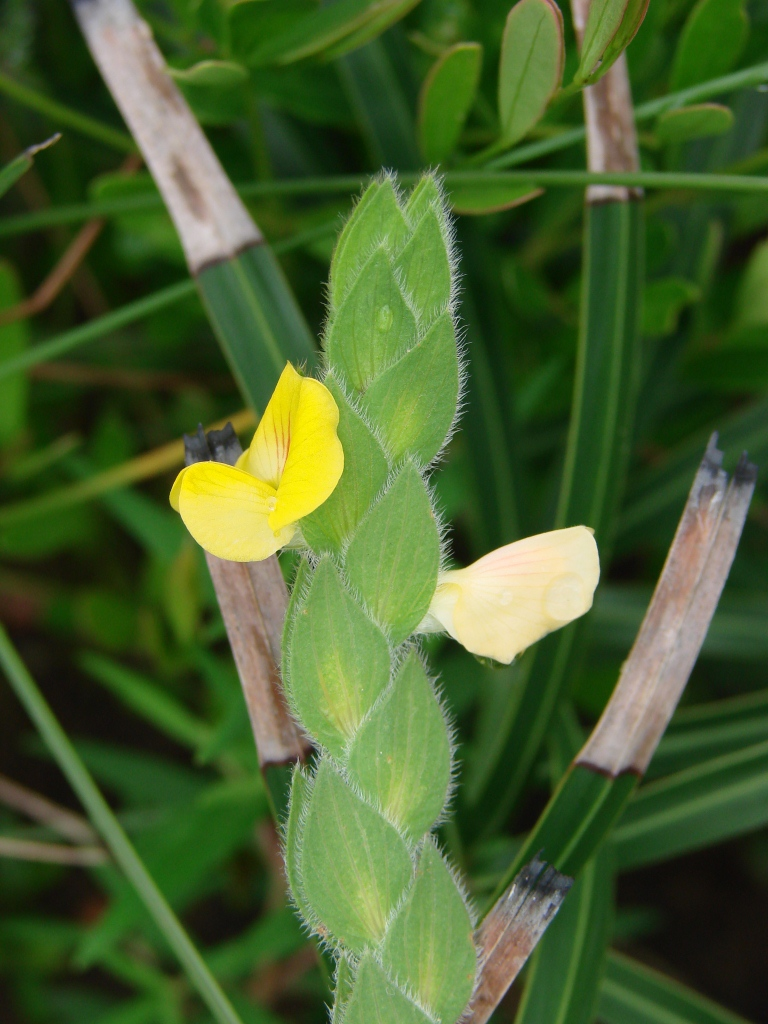
- Zornia villosa

Scientific classification
- Kingdom: Plantae
- Clade: Tracheophytes
- Clade: Angiosperms
- Clade: Eudicots
- Clade: Rosids
- Order: Fabales
- Family: Fabaceae
- Subfamily: Faboideae
- Tribe: Dalbergieae
- Genus: Zornia; J.F.Gmel.

Type species
- Zornia bracteata J.F. Gmel.

Species
- 85; see text

Synonyms
- Myriadenus Desv.

= Zornia =

Genus of legumes

Zornia is a cosmopolitan genus of herbs from the legume family Fabaceae. It was recently assigned to the informal monophyletic Adesmia clade of the Dalbergieae. The genus Zornia comprises about 80 species, notable for its pantropical distribution

== Species ==
Zornia comprises the following species:

- Zornia acuta S.T. Reynolds & A.E. Holland
- Zornia adenophora (Domin) Mohlenbr.
- Zornia albiflora Mohlenbr.
- Zornia albolutescens Mohlenbr.
- Zornia apiculata Milne-Redh.
- Zornia areolata Mohlenbr.
- Zornia baliensis Mohlenbr.
- Zornia bracteata J.F. Gmel.
- Zornia brasiliensis Vogel
- Zornia brevipes Milne-Redh.
- Zornia burkartii Vanni
- Zornia cantoniensis Mohlenbr.
- Zornia capensis Pers.
- Zornia cearensis Huber
- Zornia chaetophora F. Muell.
- Zornia contorta Mohlenbr.
- Zornia crinita (Mohlenbr.) Vanni
- Zornia cryptantha Arechav.
- Zornia curvata Mohlenbr.
- Zornia decussata Fort.-Perez, G.P. Lewis & A.M.G. Azevedo
- Zornia diphylla (L.) Pers.
- Zornia disticha S.T. Reynolds & A.E. Holland
- Zornia durumuensis De Wild.
- Zornia dyctiocarpa DC.
  - var. dyctiocarpa DC.
  - var. filifolia (Domin) S. T. Reynolds & A. E. Holland
- Zornia echinata Mohlenbr.
- Zornia echinocarpa (Meissner) Benth.
- Zornia filifoliola Pittier
- Zornia fimbriata Mohlenbr.
- Zornia flemmingioides Moric.
- Zornia floribunda S.T. Reynolds & A.E. Holland
- Zornia gardneriana Moric.
- Zornia gemella (Willd.) Vogel
- Zornia gibbosa Span.
- Zornia glabra Desv.
- Zornia glaziovii Harms
- Zornia glochidiata DC.
- Zornia grandiflora Fort.-Perez & A.M.G.Azevedo
- Zornia guanipensis Pittier
- Zornia harmsiana Standl.
- Zornia hebecarpa Mohlenbr.
- Zornia herbacea Pittier
- Zornia intecta Mohlenbr.
- Zornia laevis Schltdl. & Cham.
- Zornia lasiocarpa A.R. Molina
- Zornia latifolia Sm.
- Zornia leptophylla (Benth.) Pittier
- Zornia linearis E. Mey.
- Zornia maritima S.T. Reynolds & A.E. Holland
- Zornia megistocarpa Mohlenbr.
- Zornia melanocarpa Fort-Perez
- Zornia microphylla Desv.
- Zornia milneana Mohlenbr.
- Zornia muelleriana Mohlenbr.
- Zornia multinervosa Bacigalupo
- Zornia muriculata Mohlenbr.
- Zornia myriadena Benth.
- Zornia nuda Vogel
- Zornia oligantha S.T. Reynolds & A.E. Holland
- Zornia orbiculata Mohlenbr.
- Zornia ovata Vogel
- Zornia pallida Mohlenbr.
- Zornia papuensis Mohlenbr.
- Zornia pardina Mohlenbr.
- Zornia pedunculata S.T. Reynolds & A.E. Holland
- Zornia piurensis Mohlenbr.
- Zornia pratensis Milne-Redh.
  - subsp. barbata J. Léonard & Milne-Redh.
  - subsp. pratensis Milne-Redh.
  - var. glabrior Milne-Redh.
  - var. pratensis Milne-Redh.
- Zornia puberula Mohlenbr.
- Zornia punctatissima Milne-Redh.
- Zornia quilonensis Ravi
- Zornia ramboiana Mohlenbr.
- Zornia ramosa S.T. Reynolds & A.E. Holland
- Zornia reptans Harms
- Zornia reticulata Sm.
- Zornia sericea Moric.
- Zornia setosa Baker f.
  - subsp. obovata Baker f.
  - subsp. setosa (Baker f.) J. Léonard & Milne-Redh.
- Zornia sinaloensis Mohlenbr.
- Zornia songeensis Milne-Redh.
- Zornia stirlingii Domin
- Zornia subsessilis Fort.-Perez & A.M.G.Azevedo
- Zornia tenuifolia Moric.
- Zornia thymifolia Kunth
- Zornia trachycarpa Vogel
- Zornia ulei Harms
- Zornia vaughaniana Mohlenbr.
- Zornia venosa Mohlenbr.
- Zornia vestita Mohlenbr.
- Zornia virgata Moric.
- Zornia walkeri Arn.
- Zornia zollingeri Mohlenbr.
