= Adolphus Ypey =

Dutch botanist (1749–1822)

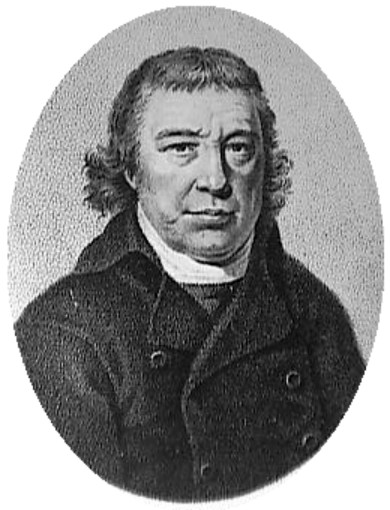
- Born: 4 June 1749; Franeker, Dutch Republic
- Died: 27 February 1822 (aged 72); Leiden, United Kingdom of the Netherlands

Academic background
- Education: University of Franeker
- Thesis: Dissertatio philosophica inauguralis de igne
- Academic advisor: Jan Hendrik van Swinden

Adolphus Ypey (4 June 1749 – 27 February 1822), also spelled Adolphus Ypeus or Adolf Ypey, was a Dutch botanist and Doctor of Philosophy and Medicine who graduated at the University of Franeker and stayed on to lecture in botany. He later lectured in Medicine at the University of Leiden.

He was the son of professor Nicolaas Ypey. His graduate dissertation was entitled Dissertatio philosophica inauguralis de igne with academic advisor Jan Hendrik van Swinden.

Ypey is best known for his richly illustrated work of one hundred plates, Vervolg ob de Avbeeldingen der artseny-gewassen met derzelver Nederduitsche en Latynsche beschryvingen, published in 1813 by the Amsterdam printer J. C. Sepp en zoon, and a supplementary work to that of Johannes Zorn.

== Gallery ==
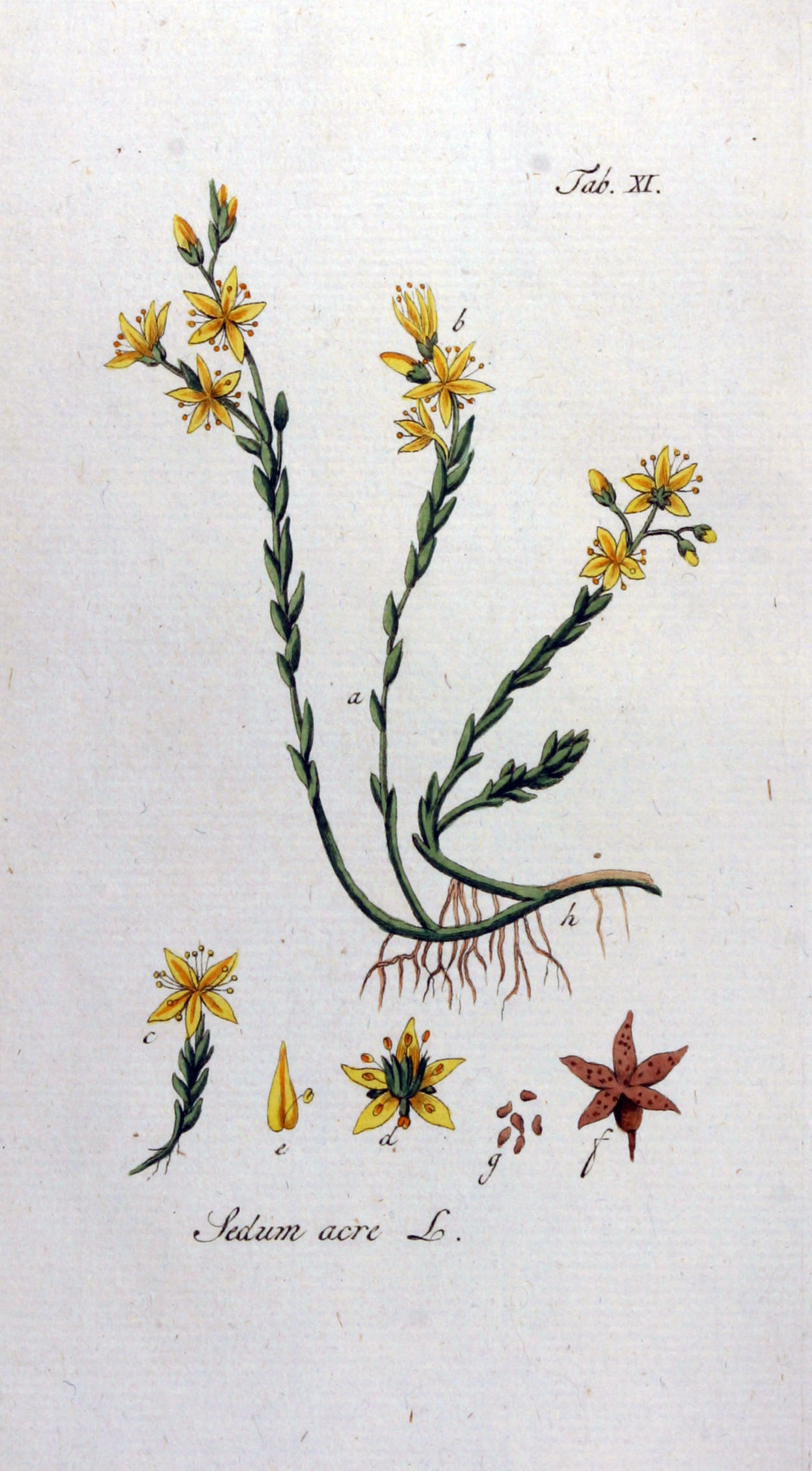
Sedum acre

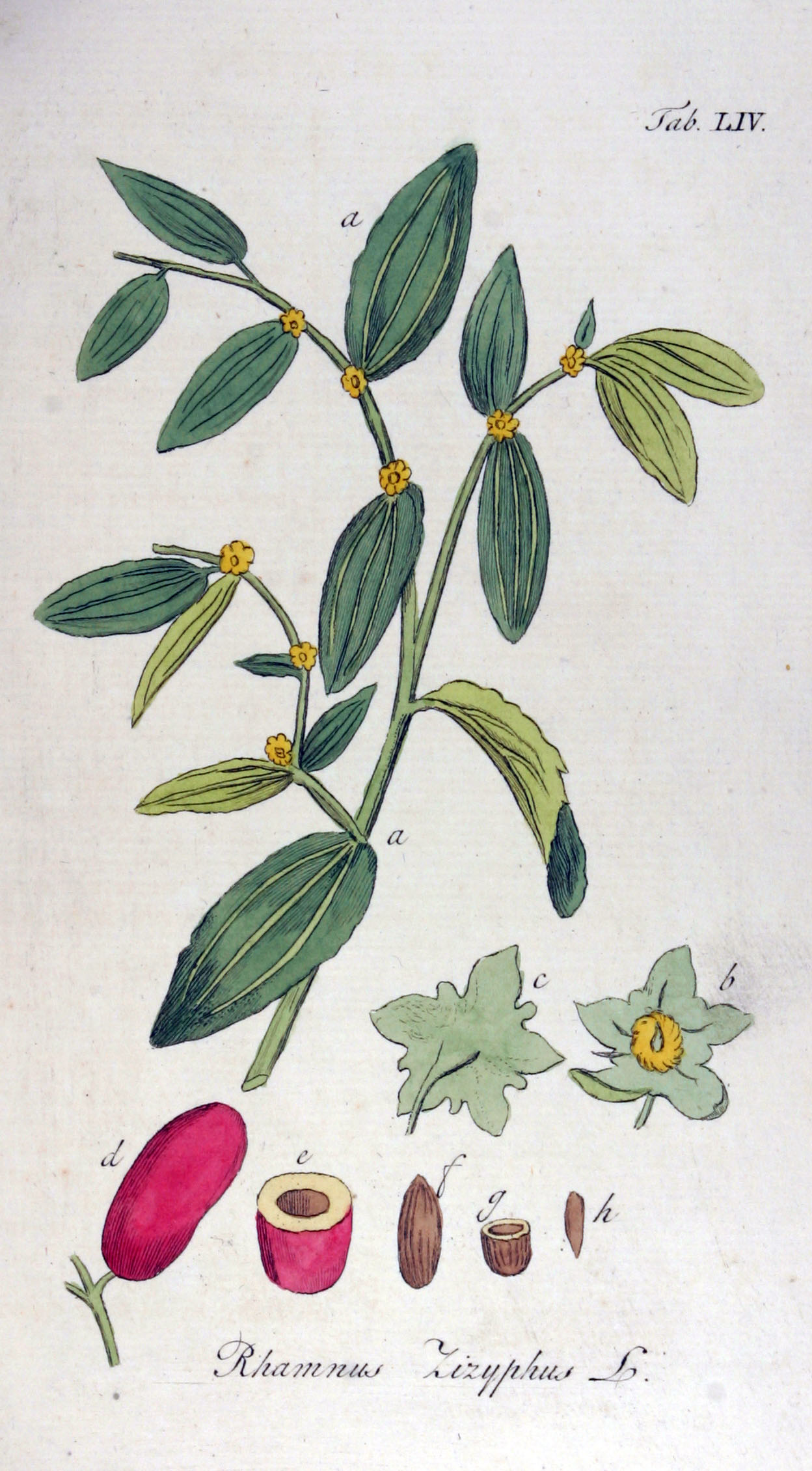
Ziziphus jujuba
