= Leonhard Wilhelm Johann Neuman =

Estonian musician, choir director, singer, and diplomat (1885–1933)

- Born: December 7, 1885; Tartu, Estonia
- Died: October 20, 1933 (aged 47); Tartu, Estonia
- Education: University of Tartu
- Occupations: Musician, choir director, singer, and diplomat
- Spouse: Paula Puusepp

Leonhard Wilhelm Johann Neuman (also Noiman; pseudonym Leenart Helisalu; December 7, 1885 – October 20, 1933) was an Estonian musician, choir director, singer, and diplomat.

== Early life and education ==
Leonhard Wilhelm Johann Neuman was born in Tartu, Estonia, the son of the innkeeper Jakob Neumann (1838–1898) and Leena Neumann (née Orraw, 1847–1910). In 1912, Neuman graduated from the School of Law of the University of Tartu. He studied singing in Tartu with Georg Stahlberg from 1908 to 1912, and in Milan and Berlin from 1912 to 1914. He also studied harmony with Rudolf Tobias at the Royal Music Institute of Berlin. From 1915 to 1916, Neuman studied at the Moscow Conservatory; later he studied music in Rome (1921–1922), Leipzig and Berlin (1922–1924), and Vienna (1927). He was a founding member of Fraternitas Estica in 1907.

== Career ==
Neuman was a music teacher in schools in Pärnu and Tartu in from 1914 to 1915 and from 1916 to 1918, the head of the press agency of the Estonian Ministry of Foreign Affairs in 1919, a teacher in Tallinn and Tartu music colleges from 1919 to 1921, and Estonia's diplomatic representative to Rome from 1921 to 1922. From 1927 to 1933, he worked as a teacher at the Tartu College of Music, and he also led several choirs, including the Tartu Academic Men's Choir from 1924 to 1933. He was the general director of the Ninth Estonian Song Festival in 1928. Neuman also performed as a vocal soloist and wrote choral music.

== Research and publications ==
Neuman published articles about Estonian music and its interpretation and about composers in Looming and Muusikaleht, as well as in foreign music journals (Säveletär, L'Europe Oriental (Brussels), and others). He contributed to reference works, including the collection Viron-Kirja (Helsinki, 1926) and Estonia (Brussels, 1930).

- K. A. Hermann eesti muusika ajaloos (K. A. Hermann in the History of Estonian Music). Looming 1923, p. 5
- Veerud eesti muusika ajaloost (Feature Columns on the History of Estonian Music). Looming 1924, pp. 2–6
- Kus ja kuidas laulu õppida (Where and How to Learn Singing). Muusikaleht 1924, pp. 2–3
- 20 aastat Eesti sümfoonia-orkestrit (Twenty Years of the Estonian Symphony Orchestra). Muusikaleht 1927, p. 11
- Mis on häälekultuur (What Is Voice Culture). Muusikaleht 1929, p. 1
- Häälekultuur ühtlustatud koorilaulu alusena (Voice Culture as a Basis for Harmonized Choral Singing). Muusikaleht 1929, p. 2
- Ooperetilauljate ettevalmistamisest (The Training of Opera Singers). Muusikaleht 1930, p. 3
- Meie muusikaelu sajandi algul (Our Musical Life at the Beginning of the Century). Looming 1930, p. 1

== Personal life ==
Neuman married the soprano Pauline "Paula" Elisabeth Puusepp (1896–1944).
