= Ferlo Sud Wildlife Reserve =

Protected area in Senegal

- Réserve de Faune du Ferlo-Sud
- IUCN category IV (habitat/species management area)
- Location within Senegal
- Location: Senegal
- Nearest city: Loungue Tekodie
- Coordinates: 14°50′00″N 14°00′00″W
- Area: 6,337 km^{2} (2,447 sq mi)
- Established: 1972

The Ferlo Sud Wildlife Reserve (French: Réserve de Faune du Ferlo-Sud), established in 1972, is a 6,337 square kilometres (2,447 sq mi) IUCN habitat and species protected nature reserve located in Senegal. The nature reserve is bordered by the Ferlo Nord Wildlife Reserve to the north.
