= Alfredo Castillero Hoyos =

Panamanian political scienctist and activist

Academic background
- Education: University of Warwick (MA); University of Portsmouth (PhD)

Academic work
- Discipline: Political science

Alfredo Castillero Hoyos is a Panamanian political scientist, human rights activist, and professor. He was a member of the United Nations Human Rights Committee and ran for the ombudsman office of Panama.

Alfredo Castillero Hoyos graduated at the University of Warwick where he obtained a master's degree in political studies in 1993. He then went on to complete post-graduate studies in the methodology of social sciences and a doctorate in political studies, both at the University of Portsmouth in 1999.
