= Leonhard Harding =

German historian

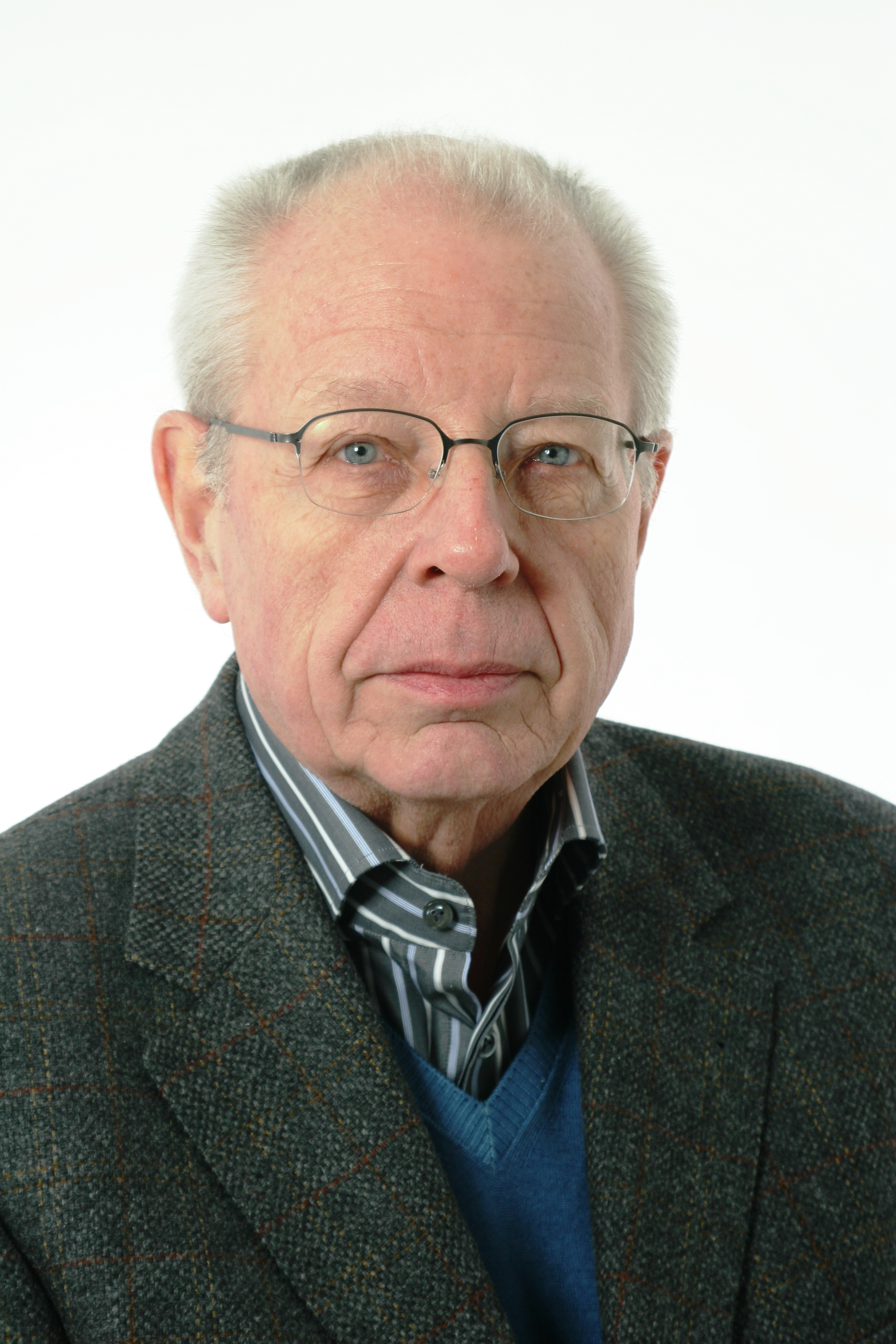
- Harding in 2010
- Born: 14 September 1936 (age 90)

Academic background
- Education: Free University of Berlin

Academic work
- Discipline: History; Development studies; African studies; area studies
- Institutions: University of Hamburg; University of Cologne

Leonhard Harding (born September 14, 1936, in Paderborn) is a German historian and scholar in African studies.

== Biography ==
Leonhard Harding attended elementary school in Paderborn for four years. From 1948 to 1956 he attended high schools in Rietberg and Großkrotzenburg. In 1956 the matriculation examination followed. He studied philosophy for four semesters at the philosophical college of the White Fathers in Trier. From 1959 to 1963 he studied Catholic theology and history of missions in Leuven. In 1963 he began studying history at the Saarland University. In 1965 he passed the secondary school teacher examination for history. Then he went to Cologne. From 1969 he was a student at the Free University of Berlin. Under the direction of de:Franz Ansprenger (1927–2020), he dealt with problems in Africa's colonial history. In 1972 he received his doctorate from Ansprenger at the Free University of Berlin with a thesis on French religious policy in West Africa. In it he examined the French religious policy in the colony "Soudan Français", the area of today's states Burkina Faso, Mali and Niger. Harding worked at the African Politics Office at the Free University of Berlin. From 1981 to 2001, Harding taught as a professor of African history at the Historical Seminar of the University of Hamburg.

Harding established intensive cooperation with African universities and research institutions. From 1980 to 1982 he organized an international research project on Commerce and Traders in West Africa: Senegal and Ivory Coast (19th and 20th Century). African professors and doctoral students were regularly in Hamburg. Hamburg students and postgraduates travelled to various African countries for study and research purposes under his supervision. Through his long tenure, Harding helped Hamburg develop into a leading centre for teaching and research on the history of Africa in Germany. In 1998, Harding, together with three other Hamburg historians, successfully opposed the discriminatory treatment of foreign, especially African, guest professors by the immigration authorities, which endangered the international reputation of Hamburg as a science location. From 2008 to 2014, Harding was lecturer in African history at the University of Cologne. Harding's research focus is the History of Africa, in particular the economic and social history of West Africa, the intellectual and cultural history of West Africa, the Kingdom of Benin and conflicts in Central Africa. He authored a well-known introduction to the study of African history, which was published in 1992. In 1999 he published an event- and problem-oriented overview for a first introduction to the history of Africa in the 19th and 20th centuries. One of Harding's most important academic students is de:Andreas Eckert. After Harding retired in 2002, Eckert became his successor as Professor of African History at the University of Hamburg (2002–2007) before the latter moved in 2007 teaching on the history of Africa at the Humboldt University of Berlin.

== Publications (selection) ==
- Le retrait de la France du Mali : un échec militaire et politique ? WP, academia.edu, 8 May 2022 (accessed: 25 March 2022)
- Le Cameroun par les sources: Le début de la servitude. Le Cameroun sous domination allemande. WP, academia.edu, 7 December 2017 (accessed: 25 March 2023)
- Geschichte Afrikas im 19. und 20. Jahrhundert.vol. 27, 3. ed, Oldenbourg, Munich, 2013, ISBN 978-348-67170-2-0.
- Das Königreich Benin. Geschichte – Kultur – Wirtschaft. Oldenbourg, Munich, 2010, ISBN 978-3-486-59757-8.
- Einführung in das Studium der afrikanischen Geschichte (= Hamburger Studien zur afrikanischen Geschichte. vol. 4). Lit, Münster u. a. 1992, ISBN 3-89473-107-9.
- Die Politik der Republik Südafrika. Eine Strategie der regionalen Kooperation (= Entwicklung und Frieden. Bd. 6). Kaiser Verlag u. a., Munich u. a. 1975, ISBN 3-459-01034-7.
- Französische Religionspolitik in Westafrika. „Soudan Français“ 1895–1920. Berlin (West), Free University, Doctoral Thesis, 1972.
