= War Merit Cross (disambiguation) =

The War Merit Cross was a military decoration of the Third Reich.

War Merit Cross may also refer to:

- War Merit Cross (Baden)
- War Merit Cross (Brunswick)
- War Merit Cross (Italy)
- War Merit Cross (Lippe)
- War Merit Cross (Reuss)
- War Merit Cross (Saxony)
