= Ferlo Nord Wildlife Reserve =

- Réserve de Faune du Ferlo-Nord
- IUCN category IV (habitat/species management area)
- Location within Senegal
- Location: Senegal
- Nearest city: Koundi Boki
- Coordinates: 15°32′43″N 14°00′39″W
- Area: 6,000 km^{2} (2,300 sq mi)
- Established: 1971

The Ferlo Nord Wildlife Reserve (French: Réserve de Faune du Ferlo-Nord), established in 1971, is a 6,000 square kilometres (2,300 sq mi) IUCN habitat and species protected nature reserve located in Senegal. The nature reserve is bordered by the Ferlo Sud Wildlife Reserve to the south.
