= Albertoyos =

Spanish illustrator (born 1969)

Alberto de Hoyos Maso (pen name Albertoyos) is a Spanish artist dedicated to illustration, digital painting and content creation. Born in Madrid on April 7, 1969, he illustrates children's literature and young adult fiction, school books, comic books, advertising material and press.

== Biography ==
Alberto de Hoyos started as an amateur comic artist in the mid-eighties, and published his work in independent and alternative Spanish comic magazines in the nineties.

After majoring in Fine Arts at the Universidad Complutense de Madrid, he began his career as a professional illustrator and designer. His versatile style enables him to work for all ages and in a variety of fields, such as press, advertising, children's and young adult literature, and also school textbooks.

He develops his most interesting work in digital painting, children's literature and young adult fiction, where, from a mixed technique, combining computer software, pencil, painting, engraving, watercolor and collage, it has evolved to a digital technique in which it discards the imitation of traditional tools and reduces expressive resources to more artificial digital effects and textures. He illustrates and designs books, cover art and collections for various publishing companies: Pearson International, Bayard, Oxford University Press, Editorial San Pablo (Spain), Edelvives (Spain).

As for press, he collaborates as illustrator and cover page artist for Spanish newspapers and magazines: ABC, Blanco y Negro, Nuevo Trabajo, Guía de Madrid...

As a school textbook illustrator he has worked for many publishers, both Spanish (Edelvives, Santillana, Anaya, Bruño, ESC, Almadraba, Richmond...) and international (Macmillan, Oxford University Press, Pearson Education, Kumon, Disney...). His work includes all school levels, from children's education up to high school. He has also illustrated the Spanish edition of Strawberry Shortcake (American Greetings) for editorial Bruño.

Since 2018, he combines his professional work with education, teaching higher education courses in painting and digital illustration and comics.

== Work ==
=== As comic-book artist ===
- 1990 Puta Vestruz on TMEO
- 1992 Jopé (on Conciencia Planetaria, Editorial Heptada).
- 1993 Antón Gris, Ya Ves Truz (on Paté de Marrano).
- 2019 Antón Gris (en La Resistencia, Dibbuks Ediciones).
- 2020 Antón Gris (en La Residencia de Historietistas, Dibbuks Ediciones).
- 2022 Ya Ves Truz (en Zasca! cómic).
- 2025 Antón Gris (en Eme21mag, Madrid Destino).

=== As illustrator ===
- 1996 Baldomero el pistolero y los indios gordinflones. Juan Muñoz Martín. (Edelvives, Spain)
- 1998 ¡Ahí va una estrella! Albertoyos. (Edelvives, Spain)
- 2002 El coco. Luisa Villar. (Pearson)
- 2004 La elefanta Marta. Luisa Villar. (Pearson)
- 2004 La primavera Ester. Luisa Villar. (Pearson)
- 2004 Clotilde, la fábrica de chocolate. Luisa Villar. (Pearson)
- 2005 La luna Viky. Luisa Villar. (Pearson)
- 2005 Un regalo para Kiko. Luisa Villar. (Pearson)
- 2005 Yuri, el pincel. Luisa Villar. (Pearson)
- 2005 La isla del tesoro. Stevenson. (Editorial Aralia XXI, Spain)
- 2006 Gork y Bemba, polizones. Josep Lorman. (Pearson)
- 2010 El planeta Piruleta. Juan Carlos Chandro. (Bayard)
- 2011 Dan y el cometiempo. Paloma Sánchez (Editorial San Pablo, Spain)
- 2018 El laberinto de las nueve llaves. José Antonio Francés. (Editorial Babidi-Bú, Spain)
- 2018 The Strange Case of Billinghurst Castle (El extraño caso del castillo Billinghurst). David Fernández Sifres. (Edelvives International)
- 2018 The Inexplicable Appearances on Nolan Island (Las inauditas apariciones de la isla de Nolan). David Fernández Sifres. (Edelvives International)
- 2019 The Ghostly Happenings at Farrell Mansion (Los espectrales sucesos de la mansión Farrel). David Fernández Sifres. (Edelvives International)
- 2024 Mi primer Peter Pan. James Matthew Barrie (Adaptación: Isabel Carril) (Editorial Almuzara, Spain)

== Bibliography ==
- CUADRADO, Jesús (2000). De la historieta y su uso 1873-2000, Ediciones Sinsentido/Fundación Germán Sánchez Ruipérez, Spain.
