= Juan López de Hoyos =

Spanish schoolmaster and writer (1511–1583)

Juan López de Hoyos (1511–1583) was a Spanish schoolmaster and writer who lived during the Renaissance. He was the only known teacher of Miguel de Cervantes, whom he calls "my beloved disciple". He also edited the volume in which Cervantes' first published works (poems) appeared, a commemorative work on the life of Philip II of Spain's wife, Elisabeth of Valois.

== Works ==
- Declaración de las armas de Madrid y algunas antigüedades
- Relación de la muerte y honras fúnebres del SS. Príncipe D. Carlos, hijo de la Mag. del Cathólico Rey D. Philippe el segundo nuestro señor, 1568
- Hystoria y relación verdadera de la enfermedad, felicíssimo tránsito y sumptuosas exequias fúnebres de la Sereníssima Reyna de España doña Isabel de Valoys, 1569
- Real apparato, y sumptuoso recebimiento con que Madrid ... rescibio a la Sereníssima reyna D Ana de Austria, 1572 .
