= Benedikt Maria Leonhard von Werkmeister =

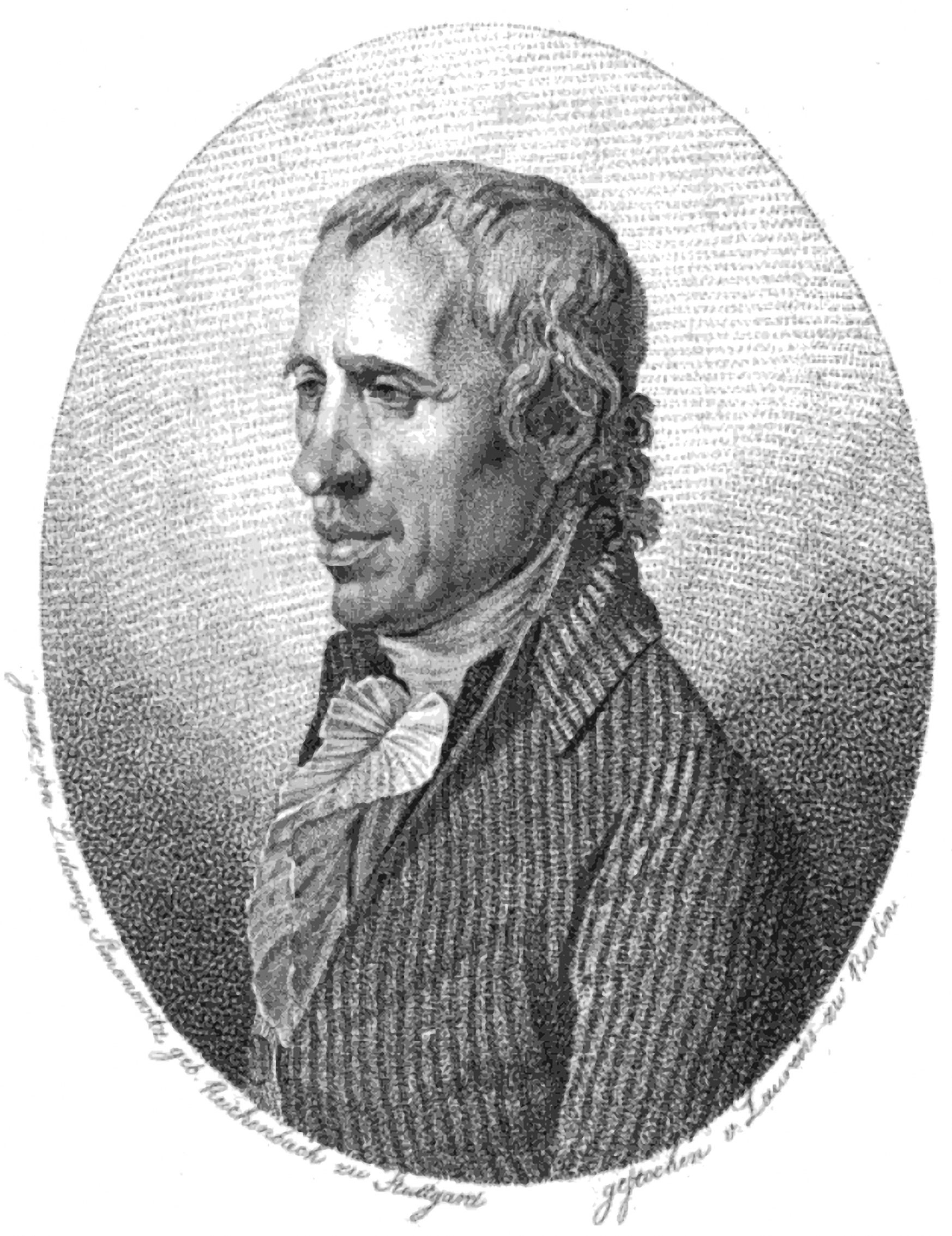
- Born: 22 October 1745; Füssen
- Died: 16 July 1823
- Occupations: Librarian; archivist; theologian
- Parents: Balthasar Werkmeister (father); Maria Regina Mayr (mother)

Benedikt Maria Leonhard von Werkmeister (22 October 1745 – 16 July 1823) was a German Roman Catholic theologian and representative of the so-called Josephinism or reformatory tendency in his Church.

== Life ==
He was born at Fussen in Upper Swabia on 22 October 1745 and became a Benedictine monk in 1765. By direction of his abbot he studied theology at Benedictbeuren, making Oriental languages and exegesis his principal subjects, and finding in father Aegidius Bartscherer a teacher who developed in him the faculty for independent research which he naturally possessed. He soon discovered that ethics, which appeared to him to be of primary importance, was altogether overlooked by theologians in their eagerness to employ their wits upon the mysterious. He could not be satisfied with the schemes of probabilists or probabiliorists, of liberalists or rigorists, among the Romish teachers of ethics, and saw himself obliged to seek for what he wanted in the lectures of the Protestants Gellert and Mosheim, and in the Life of Jesus by Hess.

In 1769 Werkmeister became a priest and superintendent of novices at Neresheim, the latter post being associated with that of professor of philosophy. He filled a similar chair at Freysing from 1772 to 1774; then became secretary to the prelate of the empire; archivist and librarian at Neresheim; and afterwards resumed his duties as professor of philosophy at Freysing, and added to them those of a director of the curriculum, of a professor of canon law, and a librarian. Duke Charles of Wurttemberg made Werkmeister his court preacher in 1784, and, being a highly enlightened Roman Catholic, permitted him to both preach and administer the ritual of his Church as he might prefer. A fruit of this liberty is presented to view in the Gesangbuch nebst angehdngten Gebeten, etc., for the ducal chapel (1784–86), which contains a large number of Protestant hymns and tunes, and is wholly in keeping with the general style of hymnology and liturgy in that time.

Physical ailments began to trouble Werkmeister seriously in 1787, and to make it difficult and ultimately impossible for him to preach; and as the presumptive heir to the throne, Louis Eugene, brother of Charles, was known to be a bigot, and likely to dismiss every liberal priest from his service whenever he should have the power, he applied for secularization and the canonry of Spires. The former was granted and the latter denied, and in 1794 Werkmeister and his colleagues were superseded by Franciscans and Capuchins. The duke even requested that Werkmeister should be banished; but the Monastery of Neresheim gave him asylum until another change in the succession of the duchy took place, when he was recalled to his former post at Stuttgart. He now applied for and received the parish of Steinbach (1796). In 1807 he became a member of the ecclesiastical council for the Romnish Church in Wurtemberg, and in 1810 of the newly erected supervisory council. In 1816 he was appointed to the direction of education, and in 1817 he received the title of high councillor for ecclesiastical affairs and the knight's cross of the Order of the Wurtembergian Crown. He died on 16 July 1823.

== Thought and publications ==
Werkmeister was a rationalist, though of the noble sort, and lacked profoundness of religious thought and feeling. He never penetrated into the spiritual depths of religion, but, on the other hand, he never sought to set aside the authority of Scripture and of the received doctrines of the evangelical faith. He had the boldness to attack various Romish teachings and institutions, e.g. the celibacy of priests, the worship of Mary, the indissolubility of marriage, etc. He did not regard his course in this respect as involving him in conflict with the Church, but only with what was impure and spurious that had fastened itself upon her in the progress of ages. It would seem, nevertheless, that he carried about with him the idea of a German National Church which should be independent of Rome, but nonetheless Roman Catholic. His works of a literary character possess only historical interest at this distance from his time. The most important is the Jahresschrift fur Theologie und Kirchenrecht der Katholiken (1806–20, 5 volumes, edited by him), in which he opposes many abuses of the Roman Catholic. Church. Of his ascetical works, his Neues Gebetbuch fur aufgeklarte katholische Christen (Heilbronn, 1801; 11th ed. 1818) is especially deserving of mention, as well as his Sermons (1812–15, 3 volumes). See Schmidt, Neuer Nekrolog der Deutschen, 1823, 2:578; Herzog, Real-Encyklop. s.v.
