= Elke Leonhard =

German politician (1949–2025)

Member of the Bundestag
- In office 20 December 1990 – 18 October 2005

Personal details
- Born: 17 May 1949 Fritzlar, Hesse, Germany
- Died: 1 January 2025 (aged 75) Berlin, Germany
- Party: SPD
- Education: Goethe University Frankfurt; Yale University
- Occupation: Journalist

Elke Leonhard (17 May 1949 – 1 January 2025) was a German politician. A member of the Social Democratic Party, she served in the Bundestag from 1990 to 2005.

Leonhard died in Berlin on 1 January 2025, at the age of 75.
