= Zornia glochidiata =

Scientific classification
- Kingdom: Plantae
- Clade: Tracheophytes
- Clade: Angiosperms
- Clade: Eudicots
- Clade: Rosids
- Order: Fabales
- Family: Fabaceae
- Subfamily: Faboideae
- Genus: Zornia
- Species: Z. glochidiata

Binomial name
- Zornia glochidiata Rchb. ex DC.

Species of plant

Zornia glochidiata is a leguminous herb of the Fabaceae family. It is widely distributed in the Sahel regions of West Africa, and is reputed to be an important forage plant in the region.

== Morphology ==
Zornia glochidiata is an annual herb with erect or decumbent stems, which can grow up to 45 cm (18 in) tall. Compound and broad leaves, two foliate; leaflets, ovate - lanceolate, acute at apex and up to 45 mm × 15 mm (1.77 in × 0.59 in), glabrescent or pubescent beneath. The stipules are lanceolate in shape and can grow up to 15 mm (0.59 in) in length.

== Distribution ==
Zornia glochidiata is native to many countries in East, West, and Southern Africa. It is known locally as dengeere, or dengo, among the Peul.

== Uses ==
Zornia glochidiata is an important fodder for horses and other animals in the arid and semi-arid grasslands of the Sahel, but it can cause bloating in cattle.
