= St. Leonhard am Forst =

Sankt Leonhard am Forst
- Municipality
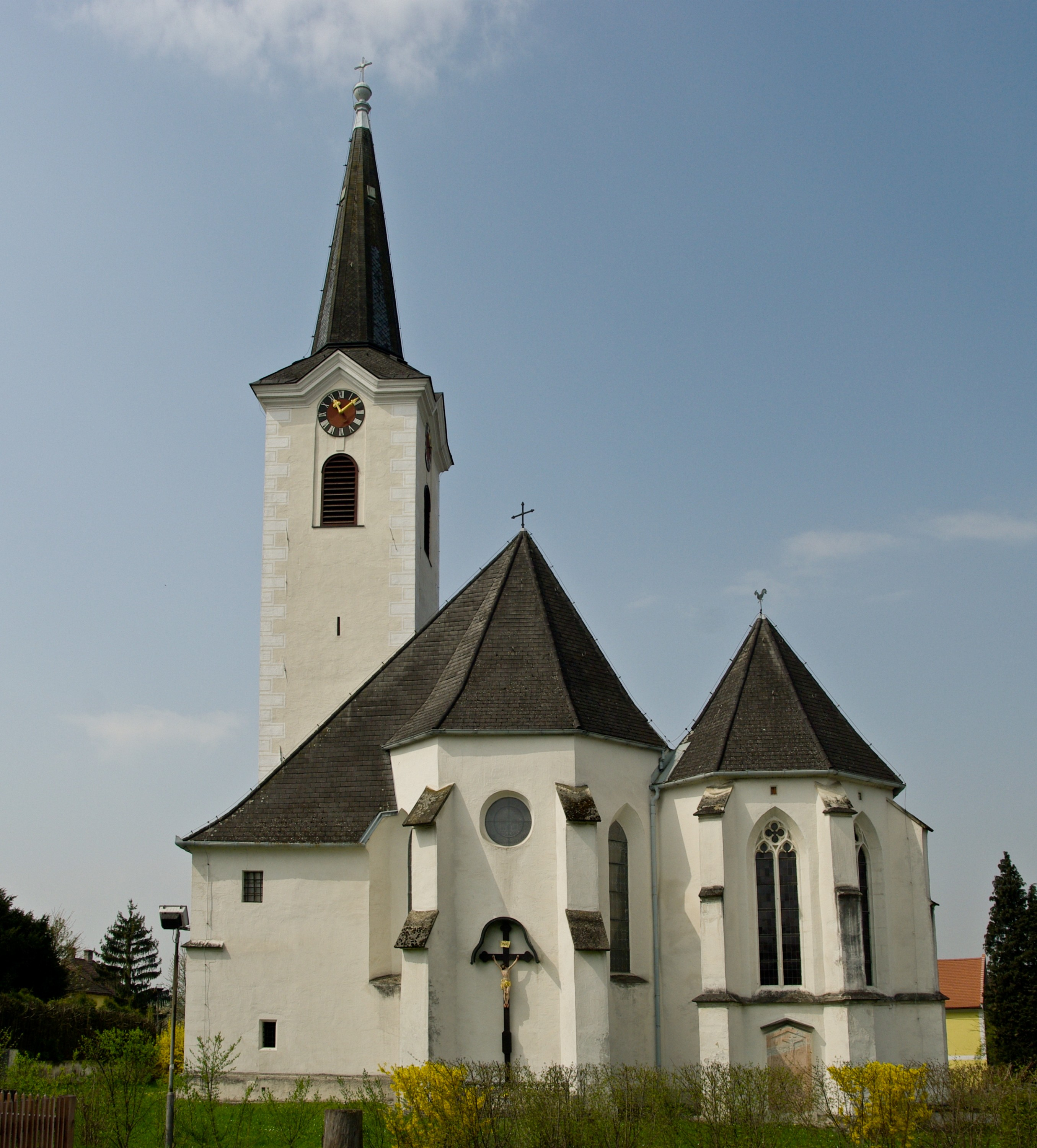
- Sankt Leonhard am Forst parish church

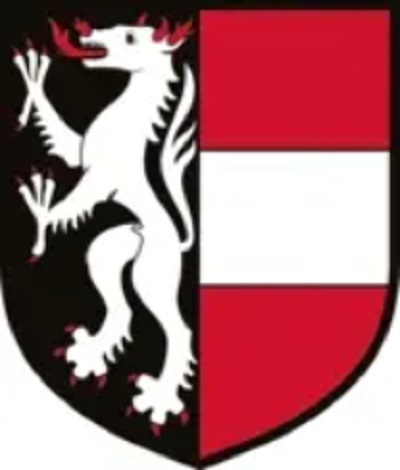
- Coat of arms

- Location within Austria
- Coordinates: 48°9′N 15°17′E
- Country: Austria
- State: Lower Austria
- District: Melk

Government
  - Mayor: Hans-Jürgen Resel

Area
  - Total: 43.51 km^{2} (16.80 sq mi)
- Elevation: 249 m (817 ft)

Population (2018-01-01)
  - Total: 2,989
  - Density: 68.70/km^{2} (177.9/sq mi)
- Time zone: UTC+1 (CET)
  - Summer (DST): UTC+2 (CEST)
- Postal code: 3243
- Area code: 02756
- Website: https://www.st-leonhard-forst.gv.at/

Sankt Leonhard am Forst is a town in the district of Melk in the Austrian state of Lower Austria.

== Population ==
Historical population
Year	Pop.	±%
1971	2,986	—
1981	2,967	−0.6%
1991	3,043	+2.6%
2001	3,025	−0.6%
