= Dieterich Leonhard Oskamp =

Dutch natural history author

Dieterich Leonhard Oskamp (1756-1803) aka Dirk Leonhard Oskamp was a Dutch natural history writer.

== Works ==
- 'Specimen botanico-physicum inaugurale, exhibens nonnula, plantarum fabricam, et veconomiam spectantia' (1789)
- 'Cineri immortalis præceptoris sepulcrali sacrum' (1792)
- 'Tabulae Plantarum Terminologicae, adjecta systematis Linnaei explicatione' (1793)
- 'Bericht wegens de uitgaave van een werk over de medicinaale kruiden' (1793)
- 'Afbeeldingen der artseny-gewassen met derzelver Nederduitsche en Latynsche beschryvingen' volume 1 (1796) - An adaptation of Johannes Zorn's "Icones plantarum medicinalium"
- 'Over de natuurlijke en ingeënte kinderpokjes' (1797)
- 'Naauwkeurige Beschryving van den grooten en kleinen Orang-outang' (1803)
