= Leonhard von Stryk =

Baltic German historian

Leonhard Gottlieb Karl von Stryk (3 February 1834 – 1882) was a Baltic German historian and author.

== Biography ==
He was born on 3 February 1834 in Livonia to Wilhelm von Stryk (1803-?) and Eleonora von Mensenkampff (1798–1876). He studied law at the Imperial University of Dorpat from 1853 to 1856. On 21 December 1876 he married Amalie von Aline Fölkersahmiga (1850–1914). He died in 1882 in Dresden.

== Publications ==
- Livländische Güter-Geschichte (1876)
- Beiträge zur Geschichte der Rittergüter Livlands. Erster Teil (1877)
- Beiträge zur Geschichte der Rittergüter Livlands. Zweiter Teil, Der lettische District (1885)
