= St. Leonhard am Hornerwald =

Sankt Leonhard am Hornerwald
- Municipality
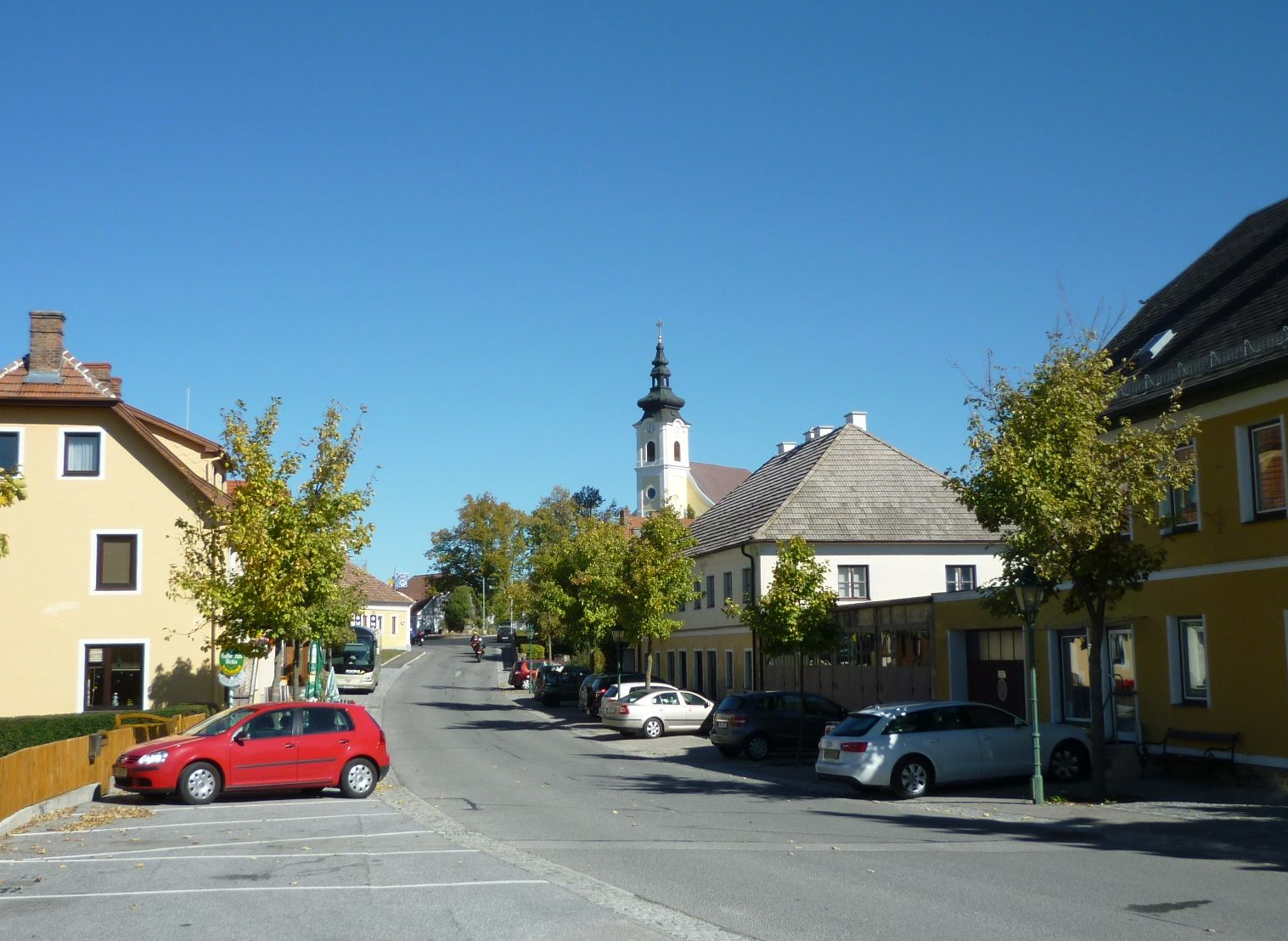
- Sankt Leonhard am Hornerwald

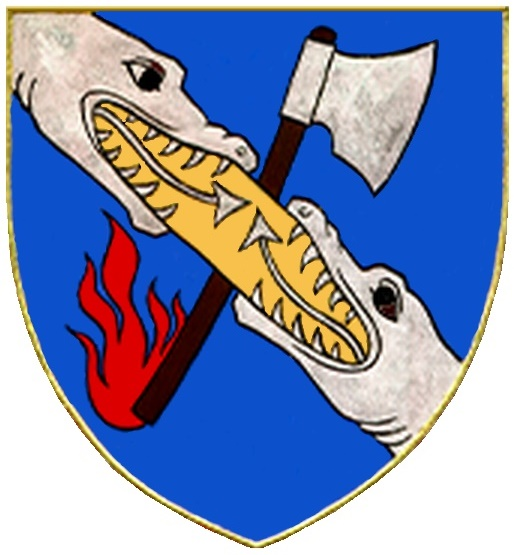
- Coat of arms

- Location within Austria
- Coordinates: 48°35′N 15°32′E
- Country: Austria
- State: Lower Austria
- District: Krems-Land

Government
  - Mayor: Eva Schachinger (ÖVP)

Area
  - Total: 51.6 km^{2} (19.9 sq mi)
- Elevation: 582 m (1,909 ft)

Population (2018-01-01)
  - Total: 1,119
  - Density: 21.7/km^{2} (56.2/sq mi)
- Time zone: UTC+1 (CET)
  - Summer (DST): UTC+2 (CEST)
- Postal code: 3572
- Area code: 02987
- Website: https://www.sankt-leonhard.at/

Sankt Leonhard am Hornerwald is a town in the district of Krems-Land in Lower Austria in Austria.

== Population ==
Historical population
Year	Pop.	±%
1851	2,678	—
1923	2,225	−16.9%
1961	1,623	−27.1%
1971	1,545	−4.8%
1981	1,306	−15.5%
1991	1,217	−6.8%
2001	1,241	+2.0%
2009	1,158	−6.7%

== Notable people ==
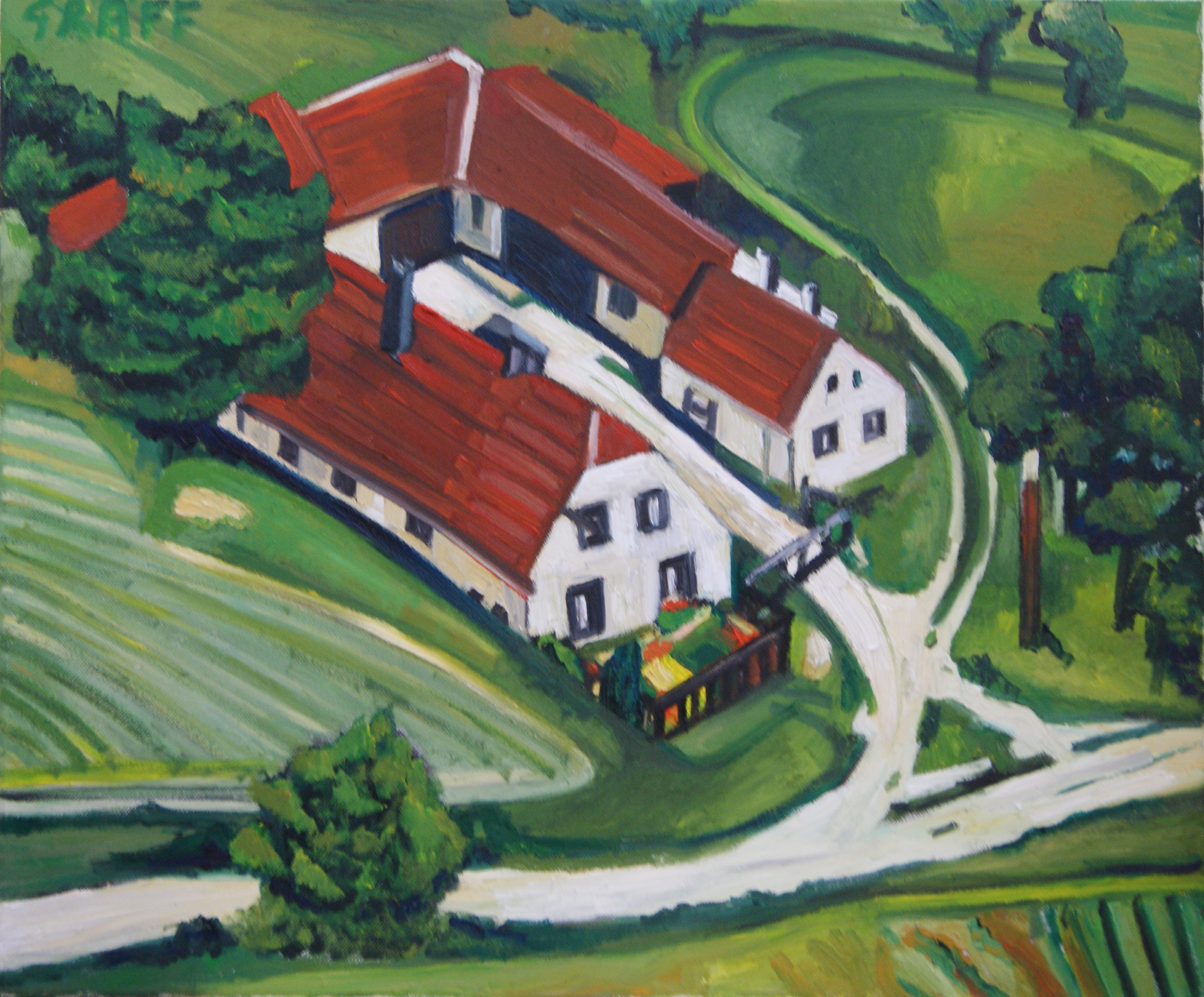
Typical farming house around the town

- Christoph Baumgartner (born 1999), footballer, was born in St. Leonhard am Hornerwald
- Josef Bugala (1908–1999), football player, was born in St. Leonhard am Hornerwald.
- Helmuth Gräff (born 1958), artist, poet, lived in St.Leonhard am Hornerwald.
- Matthias Laurenz Gräff (born 1984), artist, historian, political activist, grew up in St. Leonhard am Hornerwald
- Erni Mangold (1927–2026), actress, lives in St.Leonhard am Hornerwald.
- Paul Yvon (born 1949), journalist and author, was born in St. Leonhard am Hornerwald
