= Saint Leonard (disambiguation) =

St Leonard, Saint-Léonard or Saint-Leonard may refer to:

== Saints ==
- Saint Leonard of Noblac (or of Limoges) (died c. 559)
- Saint Leonard of Port Maurice (1676–1751)

== Places ==
=== Canada ===
- Saint-Léonard, New Brunswick, town in Madawaska County, formerly named St. Leonard
- Saint-Léonard Parish, New Brunswick, formerly named St. Leonard Parish
- Saint-Léonard, Quebec, a former city and now a borough of Montreal, Quebec, Canada
- Saint-Léonard (electoral district), a federal electoral district in Quebec, Canada
- Saint-Léonard—Saint-Michel, a federal electoral district in Quebec, Canada
- Saint-Léonard—Anjou a former federal electoral district in Quebec, Canada

=== France ===
- Belloy-Saint-Léonard, France
- Saint-Léonard, a hamlet, part of the commune of Bœrsch, in the Bas-Rhin department
- Saint-Léonard, Gers
- Saint-Léonard, commune of the Angers department
- Saint-Léonard, Marne
- Saint-Léonard, Pas-de-Calais
- Saint-Léonard, Seine-Maritime
- Saint-Léonard, Vosges
- Saint-Léonard, commune of the Epiniac department
- Saint-Léonard-de-Noblat, commune of the Haute-Vienne department
- Saint-Léonard-des-Bois, commune of the Sarthe department
- Saint-Léonard-des-Parcs, commune of the Orne department
- Saint-Léonard-en-Beauce, commune of the Loir-et-Cher department

=== Switzerland ===
- Saint-Léonard, Switzerland

=== United Kingdom ===
- Berwick St. Leonard, Wiltshire
- Drayton St. Leonard, Oxfordshire
- St Leonard's, Edinburgh, a neighbourhood of south-central Edinburgh, Scotland, United Kingdom
- St Leonards-on-Sea, a town and seaside resort in the borough of Hastings in East Sussex, England

=== United States ===
- St. Leonard, Maryland, a place in Calvert County

== Churches ==
- St Leonard, Eastcheap, London
- St Leonard, Foster Lane, London

== In sport ==
- Patinoire Saint-Léonard, indoor sporting arena located in Fribourg, Switzerland
- St. Leonards F.C. a semi-professional English football club based in Hastings, East Sussex

== See also ==
- San Leonardo (disambiguation)
- St. Leonard (disambiguation)
- St Leonards (disambiguation)
- Leonard (disambiguation)
- Leonard (surname)
- Lenny (disambiguation)
- Leonardo (disambiguation)
