= Lenny =

Lenny or Lennie may refer to:

== People and fictional characters ==
- Lenny (given name), a list of people and fictional characters
- Lennie (surname), a list of people
- Lenny (singer) (born 1993), Czech songwriter
- lennie (singer) (born 2001), Croatian singer-songwriter
- Lenny Schultz (born 1933), retired American comedian and actor

== Arts and entertainment ==
=== Music ===
- Lenny (album), by Lenny Kravitz, 2001
- "Lenny" (instrumental), by Stevie Ray Vaughan, 1982
- "Lenny" (Buggles song), a 1982 song by The Buggles
- "Lenny" (Supergrass song), a 1995 song by Supergrass
- Lenny, a guitar owned by Stevie Ray Vaughan
- Leonard Bernstein, American conductor, pianist and composer, also known as Lenny

=== Other arts and entertainment ===
- Lenny (bot), an anti-telemarketing chatbot
- Lenny (film), a 1974 biography of Lenny Bruce
- "Lenny" (short story), a 1958 short story by author Isaac Asimov
- Lenny (TV series), a 1990–1991 situation comedy starring Lenny Clarke
- Lenny face (Internet emoticon), used to express sexual innuendo, or mischief

== Other uses ==
- Hurricane Lenny, a 1999 hurricane in the Atlantic Ocean
- Lenny's Sub Shop, a sandwich-shop chain
- "Lennies", stationary lenticular clouds
- Lenny, the codename of version 5.0 of the Debian Linux operating system

== See also ==
- Lennie (barque), a Canadian-built barque
- Leny (disambiguation)
- Leonard (disambiguation)
- Leonardo (disambiguation)
- Lemmy (1945–2015), British musician
