= Leonhardt =

Leonhardt is a surname. Notable people with the surname include:

- Andreas Leonhardt (1800–1866), Austrian musician
- Antonio Leonhardt (born 1994), German politician
- Brett Leonhardt (born 1982), Canadian ice hockey goaltender
- Brian Leonhardt (born 1990), American football tight end
- Carolin Leonhardt (born 1984), German sprint canoer
- Chad Leonhardt (born 1980), American mixed martial artist
- David Leonhardt (born 1973), American business journalist and Pulitzer Prize winner
- Elizabeth Leonhardt (1867–1953), American naval nurse, one of the Sacred Twenty
- Ernst Leonhardt (1885–1945), American-born Swiss Nazi politician
- Fritz Leonhardt (1909–1999), German civil engineer
- Gustav Leonhardt (1928–2012), Dutch musician
- Herbert Leonhardt (1925–1986), German skier
- Holm Arno Leonhardt (born 1952), German scientist
- Jessica Leonhardt, better known as Jessi Slaughter, cyberbullying victim
- Jürgen Leonhardt (born 1957), German classical philologist
- Kent Leonhardt (born 1954), American politician
- Olive Leonhardt (1895–1963), American illustrator
- Olivier Léonhardt (1964–2022), French politician
- Paige Leonhardt (born 2000), Australian swimmer
- Paul Saladin Leonhardt, (1877–1934), German chess master
- Ralph Leonhardt (born 1967), German skier
- Robert Leonhardt (1877–1923), Austria-born baritone
- Sven Leonhardt (born 1968), German skier
- Trudelies Leonhardt (born 1931), Dutch musician based in Switzerland
- Ulf Leonhardt (born 1965), German-British scientist

== See also ==
- Leonard (disambiguation)
- Leonhard (disambiguation)
- Leonhart
