= Leonhart =

Leonhart may refer to:

- Leonhart (surname)
- Squall Leonhart, a character from the video game Final Fantasy VIII
- Leonhart Fuchs, a German physician and botanist, b. 1501
- Annie Leonhart, a character from the show/anime Attack on Titan

== See also ==
- Leon Hart (disambiguation)
- Leonard#Variations
- Leonard (disambiguation)
