= Unic (disambiguation) =

Unic is a former French car manufacturer.

Unic, UNIC, or UNICS may also refer to:

- UNIC Project, a satellite Internet access project supported by the European Commission
- UNICS Kazan, a professional basketball club in Russia
- United Nations Information Centres
- University of Nicosia
- Unic, a manufacturer of espresso machines owned by Electrolux Professional
- UNIC, a Portuguese microcomputer that followed the Ener 1000

== See also ==
- Uniq
- Unix
