= Leonard (disambiguation) =

Leonard is both a masculine given name and a surname.

Leonard may also refer to:

== Places in the United States ==
- Leonard, Michigan
- Leonard, Minnesota
- Leonard, Missouri
- Leonard, North Dakota
- Leonard, Oklahoma
- Leonard, Texas

== Other uses ==
- Léonard (comics), a Belgian comic series
- Leonard (demon), in the Dictionnaire Infernal
- Leonard Part 6, a 1987 American spy parody film
- Leonard Medal, honors outstanding contributions to the science of meteoritics
- Leonard (appliances), in Michigan, U.S.
- "Leonard" (song), a 1981 song by American country music artist Merle Haggard from his album Back to the Barrooms
- "Leonard", standard author abbreviation for Emery Clarence Leonard in botanical works

== See also ==
- Leonard#Variations
  - Lenny (disambiguation)
  - Leonardo (disambiguation)
  - Leonhard (disambiguation)
  - Leonhardt (disambiguation)
    - Leonhart (disambiguation)
      - Leon Hart (disambiguation)
- Leonards (disambiguation)
- Saint Leonard (disambiguation)
- St Leonards (disambiguation)
