= Kelvinator =

Appliance manufacturer

- Type: Division
- Industry: Major appliances
- Founded: 1914; 112 years ago
- Owner: Global: Electrolux; Australia: Electrolux; Argentina: Radio Victoria Fueguina; India: Reliance Retail; Philippines: Concepcion Industrial; U.S.: Electrolux Professional - commercial refrigeration for food service applications

Kelvinator is a brand name for refrigerator and freezer products in several nations. It was a major manufacturer of home appliances and commercial freezers in the United States, and its line of refrigerators was the company's namesake. The name is from William Thomson, 1st Baron Kelvin, who developed the concept of absolute zero, for whom the Kelvin temperature scale is named. The name was thought to be appropriate for a company that manufactured ice-boxes and refrigerators.

The company has undergone changes in ownership over the years, and its brand name has been licensed or sold in several countries. In the United States, Kelvinator Commercial, which produces and services food service refrigerators and freezer products for commercial applications, is part of the Electrolux Professional Group.

== History ==
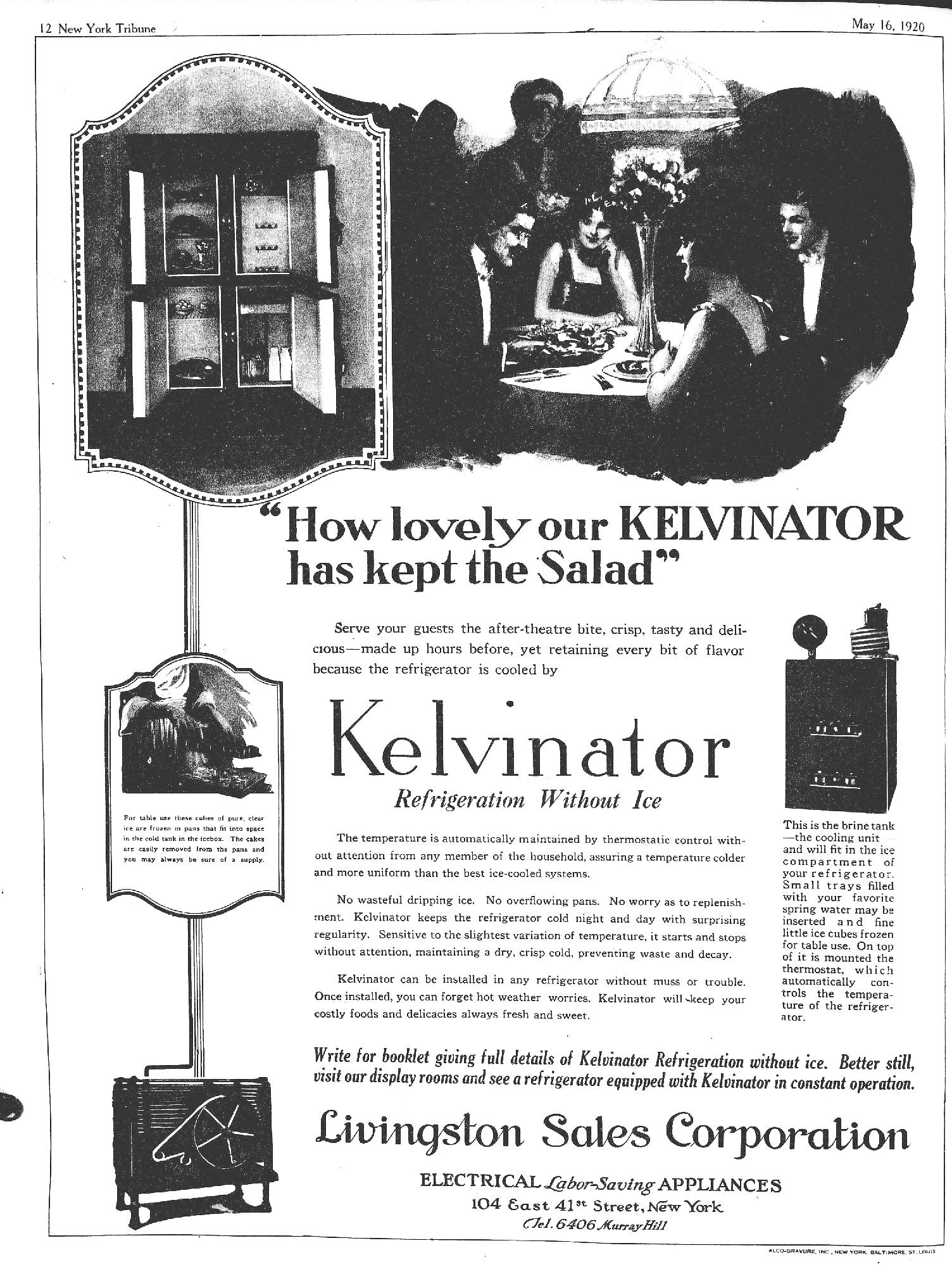
Kelvinator ad from 1920

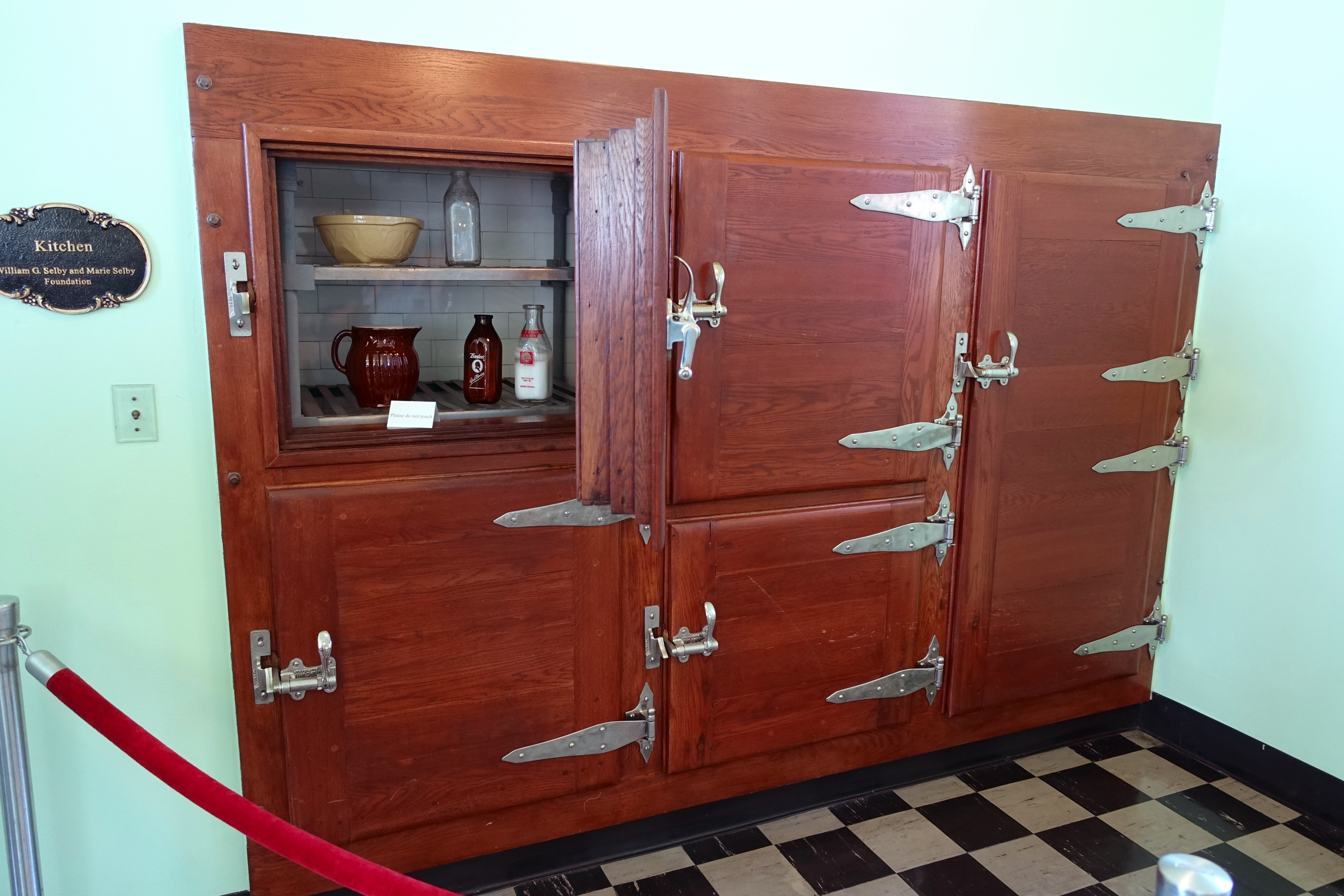
Kelvinator refrigerator, c. 1926

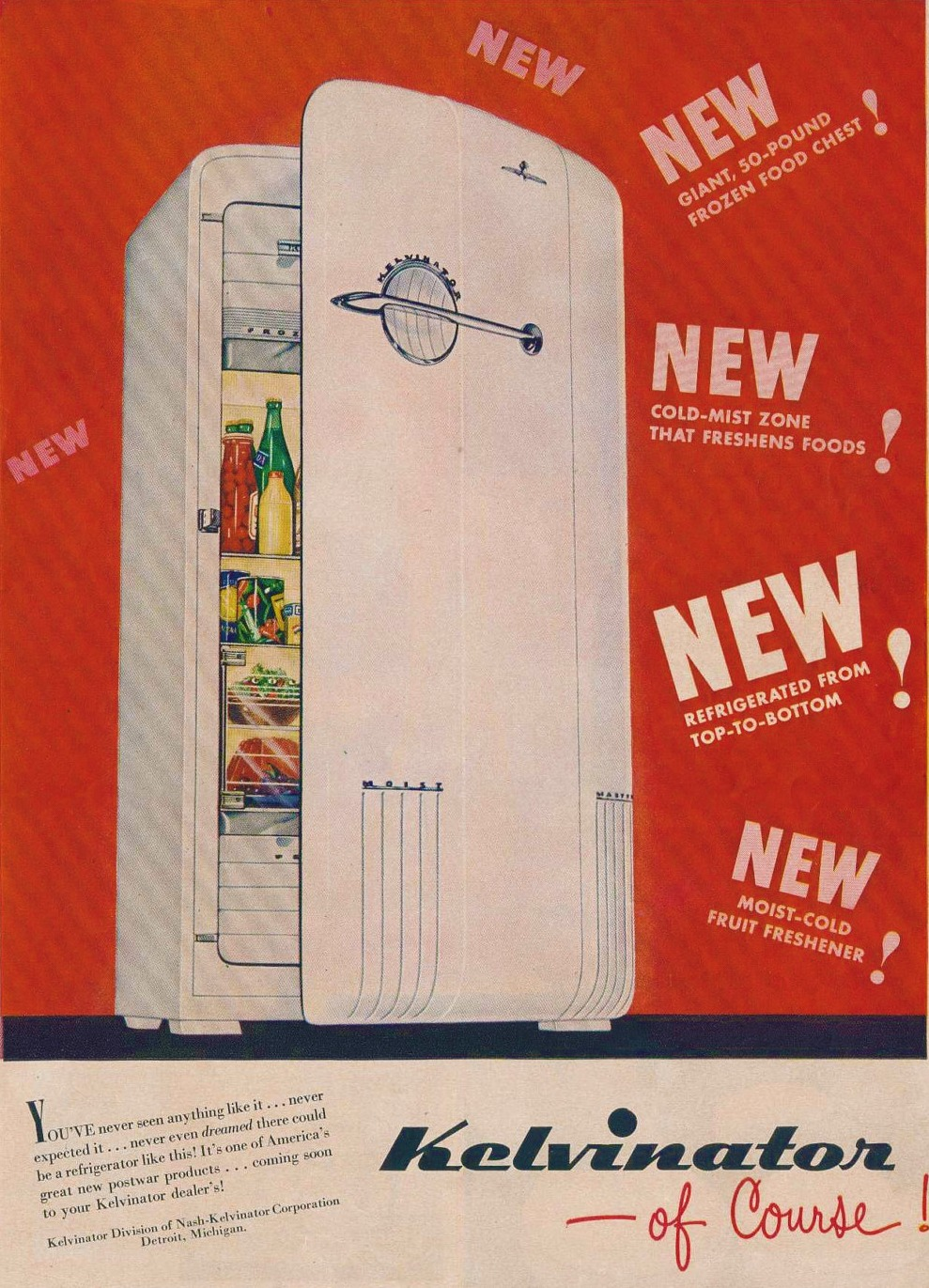
Kelvinator refrigerator ad from 1948

The enterprise was established on September 18, 1914, in Detroit, Michigan, United States, by engineer Nathaniel B. Wales, who introduced his idea for a practical electric refrigeration unit for the home to Edmund Copeland and Arnold Goss.

Wales, a young inventor, secured financial backing from Goss, secretary of the Buick automobile company, to develop the first household mechanical refrigerators to be marketed under the name "Electro-Automatic Refrigerating Company". After producing many experimental models, Wales selected one for manufacturing.

In February 1916, the name of the business was changed to "Kelvinator Company" in honor of the Irish-Scottish physicist, Lord Kelvin (William Thomson, 1st Baron Kelvin), the discoverer of absolute zero. Kelvinator was among two dozen home refrigerators introduced to the U.S. market in 1916. In 1918, Kelvinator introduced the first refrigerator featuring automatic control.

Frustrated by ice-boxes, the Grand Rapids Refrigerator Company introduced a porcelain-lined "Leonard Cleanable" ice cabinet. Kelvinator began buying Leonard's boxes for its electric refrigerated models. By 1923, the Kelvinator Company held 80% of the American market for electric refrigerators.

On July 3, 1925, Kelvinator bought Nizer Corporation in a tri-party merger valued at $20 million.

In 1926, the company acquired Leonard, which had been founded in 1881. Kelvinator concentrated its entire appliance production at the Grand Rapids factory in 1928. That year, George W. Mason assumed control of Kelvinator. Under his leadership, the company reduced its costs while increasing its market share through 1936.

In 1936, Kelvinator introduced the "Kelvin Home", one of the earliest attempts to market in-home central air conditioning and heating to ordinary consumers. Customers could choose from several different home designs, all of which were equipped with climate control systems and the latest electric appliances, and were advertised to cost about $7,500 (US$174,011 in 2025 dollars) for a six-room house. The first Kelvin Home shown to the public was located in Livonia, Michigan and attracted thousands of visitors. Several surviving homes are registered historic properties, including some in the Rosedale Gardens Historic District in Livonia and the Kelvinator House in Albuquerque, New Mexico.

== British operations ==
In 1926, Kelvinator Limited, based in England, was established in London. From importing American-made products, it grew to producing much of its own equipment for the British market. In 1946, the parent company decided to expand operations in the UK and make the unit self-contained in the manufacture of Kelvinator Equipment. The London manufacturing activities were relocated to Crewe and significantly expanded with an additional 19,000 square metres (200,000 sq ft) of floor space. The Crewe factory was shared with Rolls-Royce Motors, but burned down in the 1950s and was replaced by a new facility in Bromborough, Cheshire. The Italian manufacturer, Candy acquired the operation in 1979, along with the use of the Kelvinator brand name in the UK. Both Candy and Kelvinator products were marketed until the business was closed around 2000.

== Merger with Nash Motors ==
Kelvinator and Nash Motors announced they were merging on 27 October 1936. The merger took effect on 4 January 1937 to form Nash-Kelvinator Corporation as part of a deal that placed George W. Mason at the helm of the combined company.

Nash-Kelvinator filed a patent in 1938 for a front-end mounted, fully integrated HVAC automobile system, which was granted September 14, 1942 (#2,295,750). It showed the evaporator and heat exchangers integrated for the passenger cabin using non-flammable and low-toxicity CFC.

== World War II ==
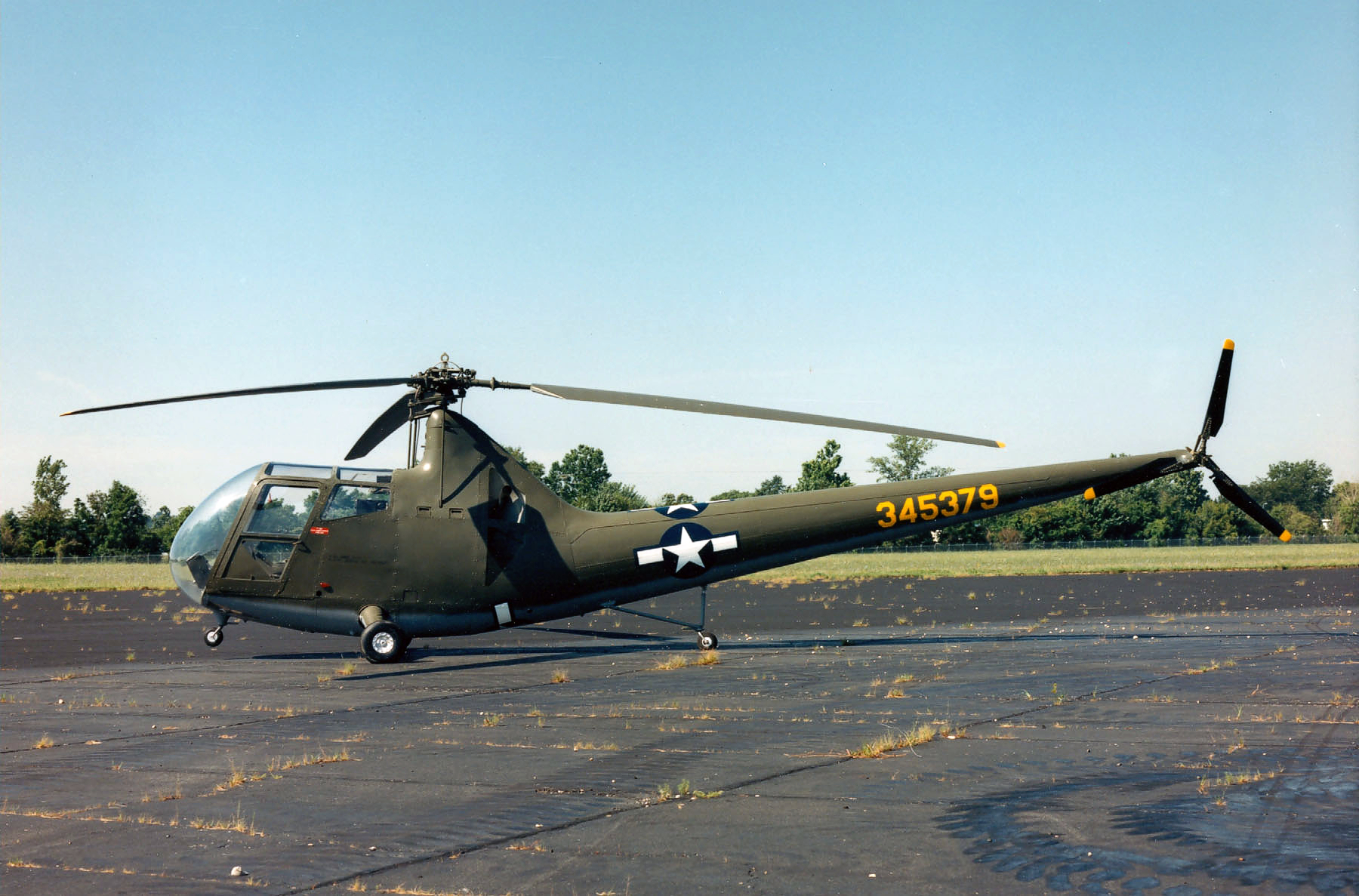
Sikorsky R-6A Hoverfly II helicopter

Between 1939 and 1945, all manufacturing was converted to produce military supplies. Except for one-ton, two-wheeled truck cargo trailers and some refrigerators, Nash-Kelvinator did not manufacture any products related to its pre-war operations.

It became the largest producer of helicopters in the U.S. during the war by making the A Hoverfly II, the most advanced helicopter design of the war. Other wartime products included three- and four-blade propellers, optical equipment and binoculars as well as Pratt & Whitney R-2800 Double Wasp radial aircraft engines. The Kelvinator refrigerator facility in Grand Rapids, Michigan, had up to 5,000 employees when it produced airplane propellers and engine parts. Nash-Kelvinator placed 27th in the value of World War II production contracts that were awarded to U.S. firms.

In Britain, Kelvinator of London contributed to the field of testing airplane components at ultra-low temperatures and instruments under high altitude conditions, research that was credited with saving the lives of many Allied aircrews.

The company pledged to introduce the scientific discoveries gained during the war production into its appliances to make them more valuable and efficient.

== Integration into American Motors ==
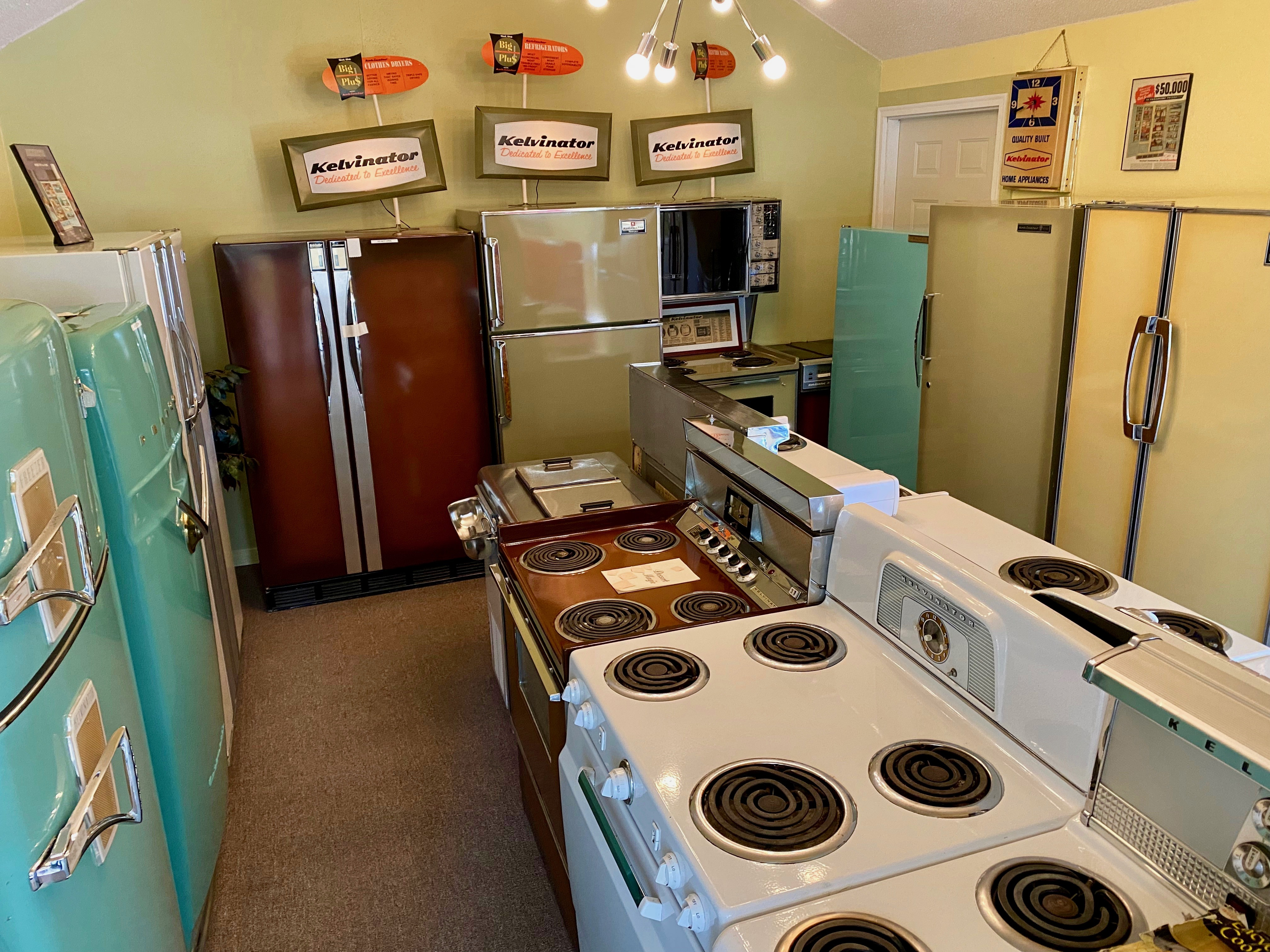
Collection of Kelvinator appliances at the Rambler Ranch

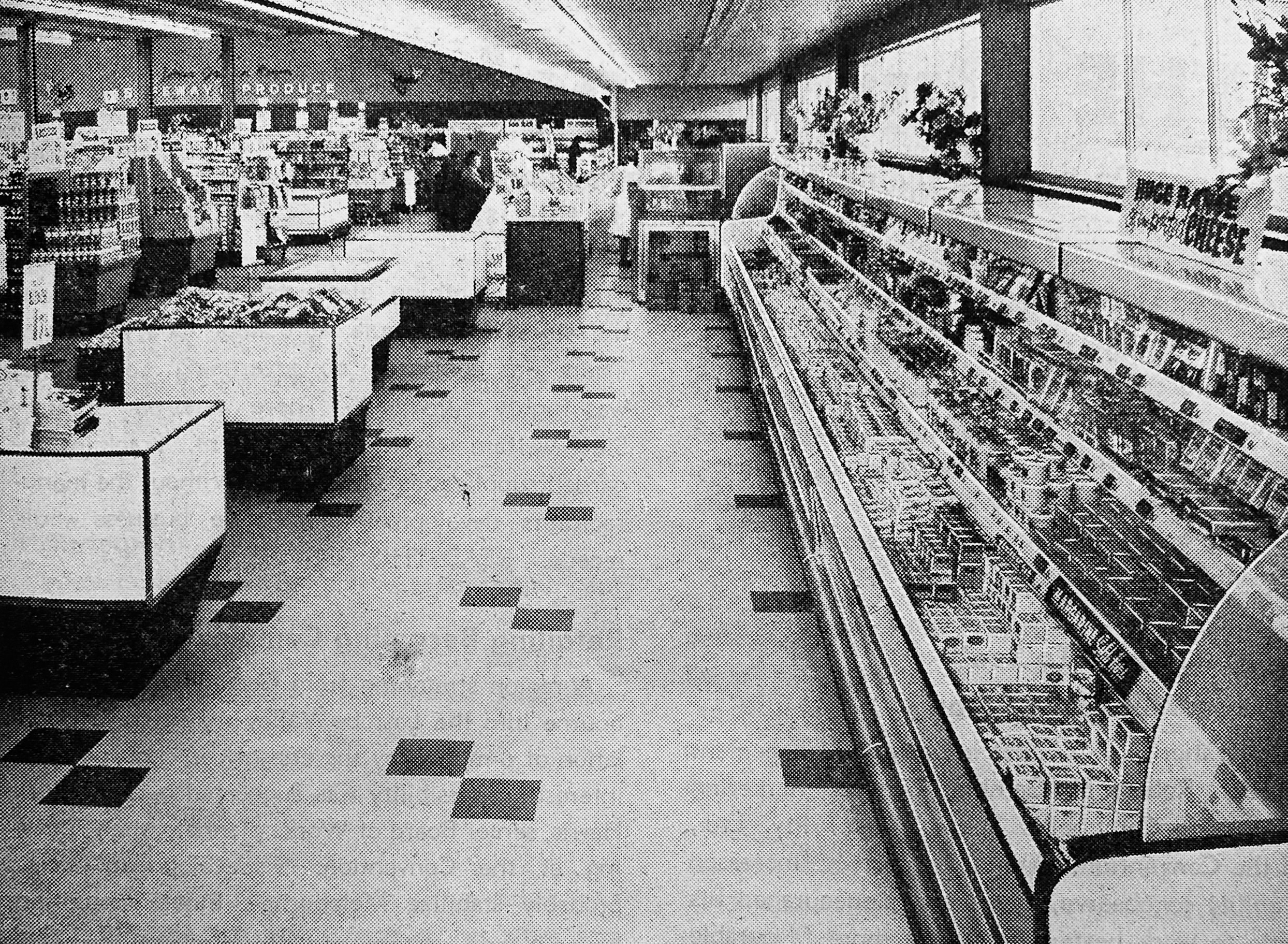
Kelvinator installation at the Forest Hills Shopping Centre in 1964

In 1952, the company acquired the Altorfer Bros. Company, which made home laundry equipment under the ABC brand name.

Nash-Kelvinator became a division of American Motors (AMC) when Nash merged with Hudson in 1954.

The 1954 model year introduced the All-Weather Eye system as an option in Nash-branded cars based on the patent filed before the War. This was the first integrated climate control system that has become the standard in vehicles.

Kelvinator introduced the first auto-defrost models.

Other innovations included Kelvinator refrigerators featuring shelves on the inside of their doors and special compartments for frozen juice containers in the freezer. It pioneered the side-by-side refrigerator freezer, the Foodarama series, in the mid-1950s.

In the 1960s, Kelvinator refrigerators introduced "picture frame" doors on some models allowing owners to decorate their appliance to match décor of their kitchens.

== Ownership ==
Under the leadership of Roy D. Chapin Jr., AMC sold off its Kelvinator operations in 1968 to focus on automobiles. AMC then purchased the Jeep brand from Kaiser Industries in 1970 to expand its line of vehicles.

Kelvinator was bought by White Consolidated Industries, which later acquired the rights to Frigidaire (originally owned by General Motors), Gibson, and White-Westinghouse product lines.

Electrolux of Sweden acquired White Consolidated Industries in 1986, and combined WCI brands with Electrolux-owned Tappan to become WCI Major Appliances Group. In the early 1990s, the name of the Dublin, Ohio-based holding company changed to Frigidaire Company.

In 1997, it was reorganized into Electrolux North America Products. The brand is focused on commercial food service products under Kelvinator Commercial. Its products include bar equipment, chest freezers and reach-ins, glass door merchandisers, as well as food preparation and dipping cabinets.

== Legacy ==
In North America, Electrolux continues to sell (under the Kelvinator Commercial brand) a range of commercial refrigeration equipment.

The Kelvinator brand is used in Argentina for a wide variety of appliances marketed by Radio Victoria Fueguina in Tierra del Fuego. The factory is in this province.

In the Philippines, the Kelvinator brand was licensed in 1977 to Concepcion Industries (now Concepcion Industrial Corporation). The firm continues to sell major appliances under this brand.

In Australia, Kelvinator Australia Ltd was formed in 1934, and manufactured and distributed products under licence from several US companies, including Kelvinator. The managing director was William Queale, while his father-in-law, F.H. Griffiths, was a co-director. In 1964, Kelvinator manufactured the largest self-service refrigeration system in an Australian supermarket (at the time) for the Forest Hills Safeway. In 1980, Kelvinator Australia became part of the Australian-owned Email Limited group of companies, whose appliance division was subsequently sold to the Swedish-owned Electrolux Group in 2001. Refrigerators and air conditioners continue to be sold under the Kelvinator brand by the Electrolux Group.

As late as 2014, residents of Robeson County, North Carolina, used "Kelvinator" to generically refer to refrigerators, due to the former presence of a Kelvinator factory in their county.

In India, the Kelvinator brand was revived in 2019, when the retail arm of Reliance Retail signed a licensing, manufacturing, marketing and distribution deal with Electrolux. They marketed a range of appliances and major appliances under the Kelvinator brand. In 2025, Reliance Retail bought the Kelvinator brand in India from Sweden's Electrolux to strengthen its position in the consumer durables marketplace. The terms of the sale were not disclosed, but an Electrolux reported a gain of 180 million Swedish crowns (US$18.5 million) from these of the brand in India.
