= Anna Possi =

Italian bartender (born 1924)

- Born: 16 November 1924 (age 102); Nebbiuno, Novara, Italy
- Occupation: Bartender
- Years active: 1958–present
- Known for: Oldest barwoman in Italy
- Spouse: Renato Guazzi (m. 1953; died 1974)
- Children: 2

Anna Possi (born 16 November 1924) is an Italian bartender, noted for her dedication and skill within the hospitality industry. Her career has been recognized as an example of the essential role service staff play in shaping the dining experience, combining efficiency with attentiveness and warmth.

== Life and career ==
Possi was born in Nebbiuno commune in Novara, on 16 November 1924. At the age of 18, she began working by helping her uncles, who owned two hotels in Novara. She later worked in a restaurant in Genoa, Liguria. In 1958, at the age of 34, she began working as a barwoman at Bar Centrale in Nebbiuno with her husband. After finishing school, she went to her uncles, who owned restaurants in Genoa, this was back in 1946, after the end of World War II. After 1945, Possi divided her time between Novara and Genoa, where she assisted relatives in their restaurants and hotels. In Genoa she developed a lasting interest in the stock market, often stopping to check prices outside a bank. She continued this habit into later life, monitoring market data daily from her computer.

She met her future husband, Renato Guazzi, a hotelier from Vezzo, at her parents’ restaurant upon his return from Genoa. Eighteen years her senior, Guazzi and Possi initially chose to live together without marrying, a decision that drew social prejudice at the time. They later married twice, once in a civil ceremony and once in church. Together they opened a restaurant, where Possi managed the bar and Guazzi served customers. Their business was characterized by conviviality and hospitality. In 1974, Guazzi died, but Possi continued running the establishment, maintaining the kindness and spirit that had defined their work. They have two children.

Possi turned 100 in November 2024, and became one of the oldest bartenders in Europe still working.
