= San Leonardo =

San Leonardo may refer to:

- Leonard of Noblac (died 559), Frankish saint

== Places in Italy ==
- San Leonardo, Friuli, a comune in Friuli Venezia Giulia
- San Leonardo, a former quarter of Milan, now within Gallaratese
  - San Leonardo (Milan Metro), a railway station
- San Leonardo in Passiria or St. Leonhard in Passeier, a comune in South Tyrol

=== Churches ===
- San Leonardo, Borgomanero, Piedmont
- San Leonardo, Carmignano, Tuscany
- San Leonardo, Matera, Basilicata
- San Leonardo, Tapigliano, Piedmont
- San Leonardo al Lago, Monteriggioni, Tuscany
- San Leonardo da Porto Maurizio ad Acilia, Rome
- San Leonardo in Arcetri, Florence
- San Leonardo in Treponzio, Tuscany

== Other places ==
- San Leonardo, Nueva Ecija, a municipality in the Philippines
- San Leonardo de Yagüe, a town and municipality in Soria, Spain
- San Leonardo de Alba de Tormes, a former monastery in Salamanca, Spain

== See also ==
- Saint Leonard (disambiguation)
