= Leonards =

Leonards may refer to:

== Places ==
=== United States ===
- Leonards, Wisconsin, an unincorporated community
- Leonards Point, an unincorporated community in the town of Algoma, Winnebago County, Wisconsin

== See also ==
- Leonard (disambiguation)
- St Leonards (disambiguation)
