= Altorfer Bros. Company =

The Altorfer Bros. Company was a washing machine manufacturer founded by brothers A.W. and Silas Altorfer in Roanoke, Illinois, in 1909.

== History ==
The brothers first created a power clothes washer after watching their sisters and mother hand-washing piles of clothes. It was basically a wooden tub mounted to a bench with wooden "fingers" to wash the clothes, and attached to a gasoline engine. The brothers invented the machine in the basement of their father's hardware store. When they could no longer fulfill orders in the basement, they moved to a factory in an old schoolhouse. In 1911, they outgrew the schoolhouse and built a new two-story factory next to the Santa Fe railroad line in Roanoke. After two years, sales of the new power washer were in the thousands. They called the machine the Roanoke Power Machine.

The company became known as the ABC Washer Company and its appliances were sold under the ABC brand. The factory in Roanoke was expanded in 1912. The Roanoke factory was destroyed by fire on February 12, 1914; in March, the company announced it would rebuild on the original foundation. On March 24, 1914, the company purchased 20 acres (8.1 ha) in East Peoria to construct a factory. The company built a new factory on West Washington Street in East Peoria, and the wooden tub was replaced with a metal tub. In 1927, ABC produced the first porcelain-lined tub. In 1928, ABC took over the Federal Washing Machine Company of Chicago, Illinois, which was producing washing machines for the Insull utilities company founded by Samuel Insull. ABC became Insull's supplier and made washing machines under the Fedelco brand exclusively for them. In August 1931, Altorfer signed a contract with Westinghouse Electric to produce three models of washing machines.

In the mid-1930s, ABC introduced a spin dryer model which eliminated the wringer and added a spin dryer to the conventional washing model. ABC filed patents for a swinging wringer. ABC also used case-hardened steel parts and precision manufacturing.

On May 15, 1943, the factory produced its last appliance and nine months later, began to produce armaments for World War II. Clyde Ulrich, the director of manufacturing at ABC, tested shells that could pierce the armor of the German tanks. The company also manufactured shells during the Korean War.

In 1952, Altorfer Bros. Company was purchased by the Nash-Kelvinator company, and began manufacturing products under the Kelvinator brand as well. The East Peoria plant was destroyed by fire in 1957.

== Awards ==
- Rice Leaders of the World Association, 1935
- Good Housekeeping Seal of Approval, 1935
- Army-Navy Production Award

== Museums ==
ABC washing machines from the 1900s can be seen at the Wheels O' Time Museum.
