= Nizer Corporation =

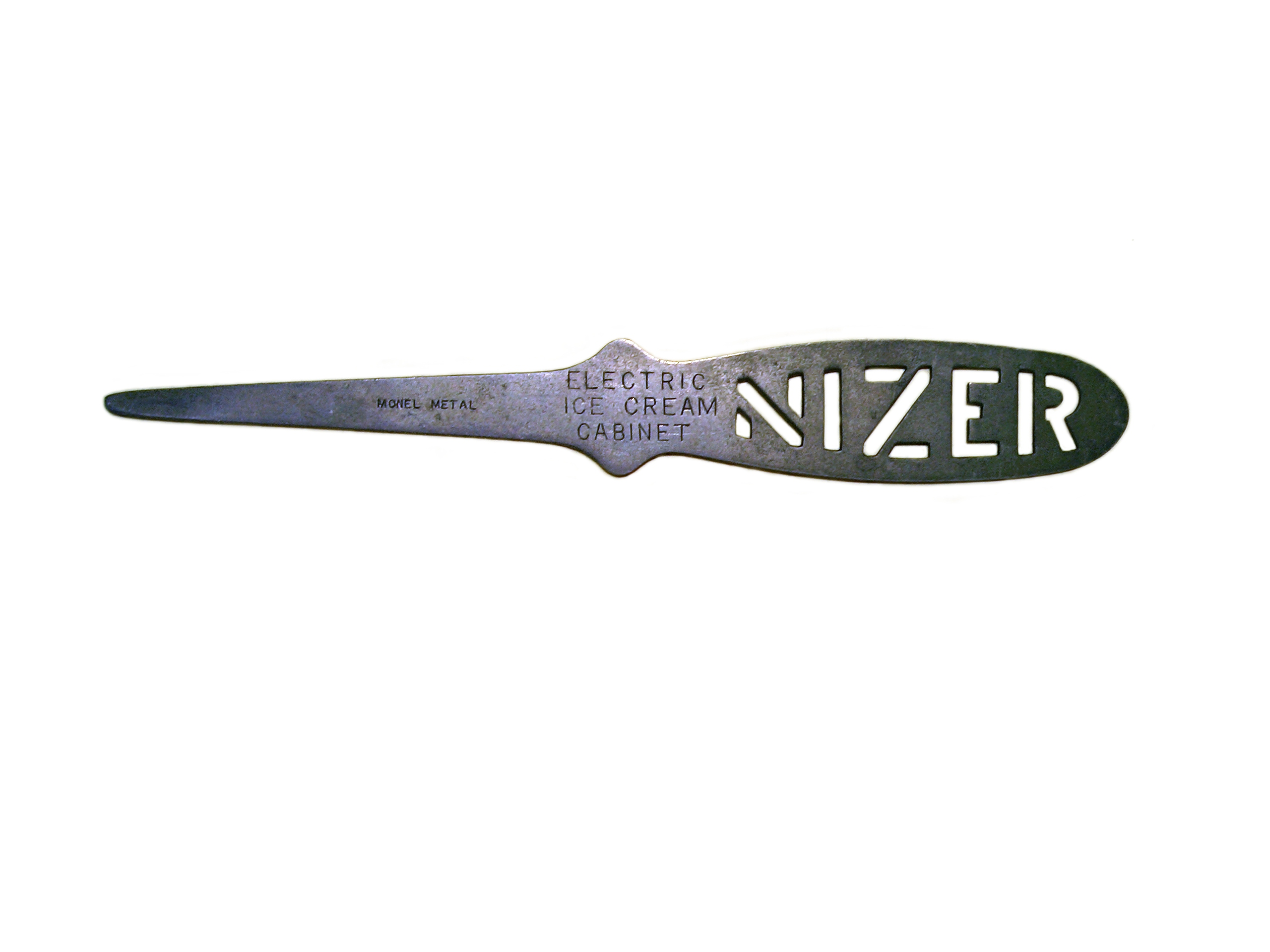
A promotional ice tool from Nizer Corporation.

Nizer Corporation was a maker of electrically cooled ice-cream cabinets and other types of commercial refrigerators, based in Detroit Michigan. During its active years, it was the market leader in this field.

The company was purchased by Kelvinator in 1926 in a tri-party merger (the third party being Grand Rapids Refrigerator Company) that was valued at $20,000,000.
