= San Giorgio, Nebbiuno =

Church building in Nebbiuno, Italy

Coordinates: 45.80621°N 8.5256°E

San Giorgio is a Roman Catholic parish church in the piazza in the town centre of Nebbiuno, province of Novara, Piedmont, Italy.

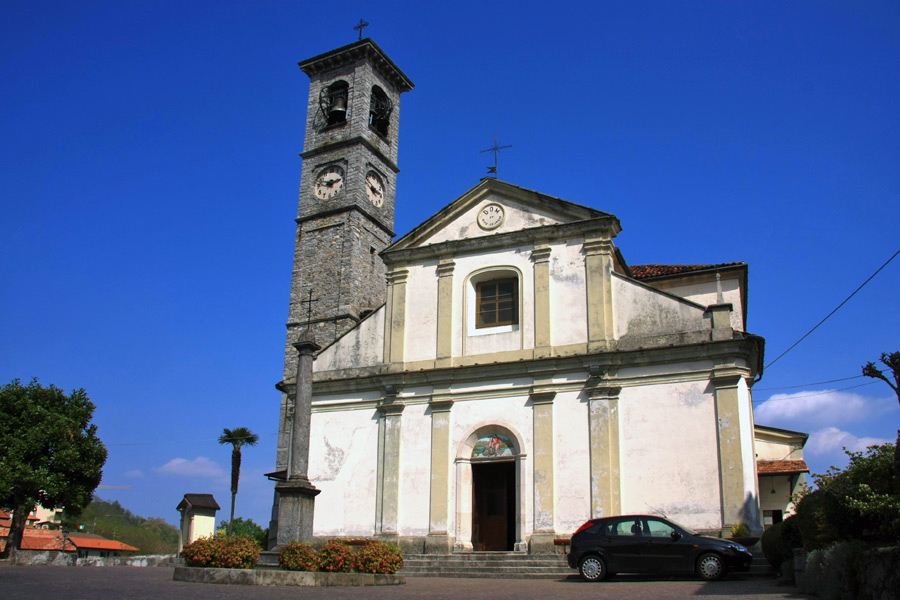
San Giorgio facade and Belltower

== History ==
A church dedicated to San Giorgio was likely erected under Lombard rule. Initially, a single nave, the church was enlarged over the centuries, and in the 18th century, lateral naves were added. In 1775, the present bell tower was erected. Above the entrance portal is a fresco depicting St George slaying the Dragon. The Chapel of the Crucifix has a baroque marble altar, and the Chapel of the Madonna del Rosario has a 16th-century wooden statue of the Virgin.
