= Sant'Agata, Fosseno =

Church building in Nebbiuno, Italy

Coordinates: 45°48′28.42″N 8°30′50.97″E

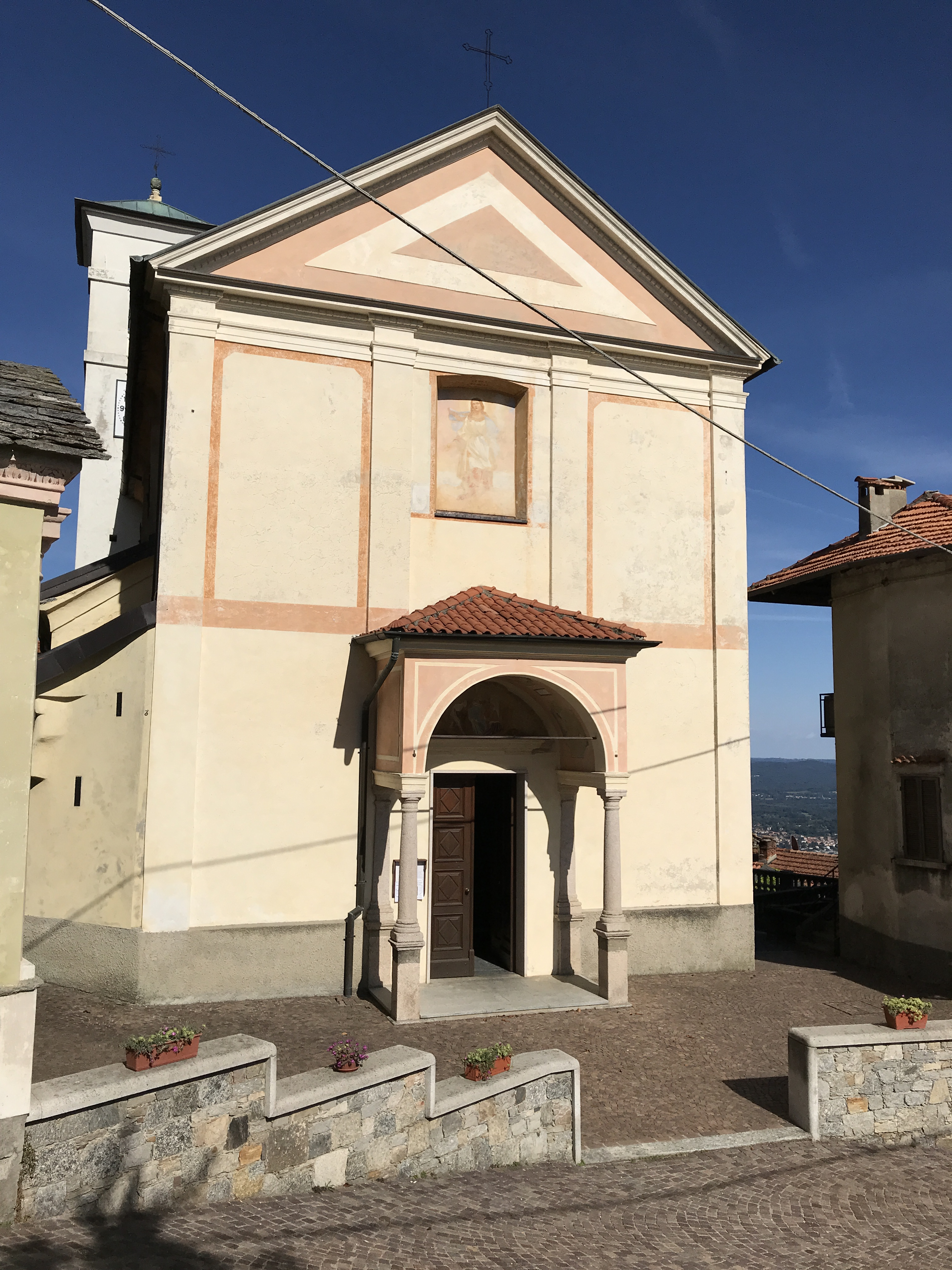

Sant'Agata is a Roman Catholic parish church in the frazione of Fosseno, in the town limits of Nebbiuno, province of Novara, Piedmont, Italy.

== History ==
A Romanesque-style parish at the site dates to medieval times, dedicated to St. Agatha. The church is documented by 1618, when it is described by the Bishop of Novara in the pastoral visit as badly done, dark, humid and low to ground. The locals are thinking of erecting one new, in a more decent and more venerable form. About sixty years later, such a project was approved by the Curia of Novara. The new church, built between 1680 and 1687, has a single nave with three arches, and four chapels along the side walls. The chapels are dedicated to the Madonna of the Rosary, the Holy Crucifix, St Joseph (later St Lucy), and St Agatha. The vault of the vestibule was frescoed in 1708 with Angels leading souls of children to Heaven. The church also has 20th-century frescoes by Giuseppe De Giorgi.
