= Leny =

Leny may refer to:

== People ==
- Leny Andrade (born 1943), Brazilian singer and musician
- Leny Marenbach (1907–1984), German film actress
- Leny Zwalve (fl. 1977), Dutch cartoonist

== Places ==
- Leny (civil parish), Ireland
- Leny, County Westmeath, Ireland

== Other ==
- Leny or Garbh Uisge, a Scottish river

== See also ==
- Lenny (disambiguation)
