= Rambler Ranch =

Automobile collection and museum in Colorado, United States

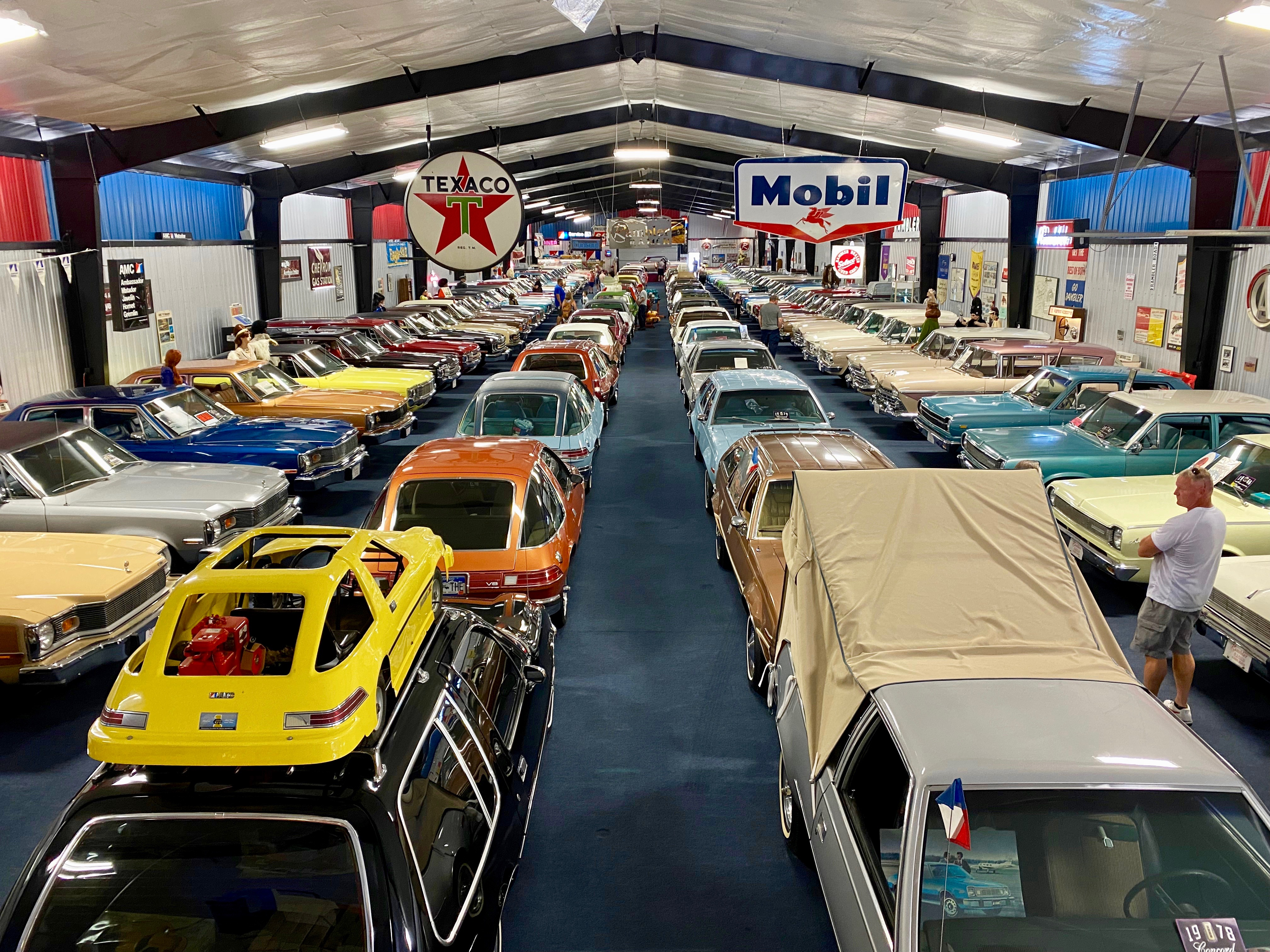
- Over 100 cars in the AMC building
- Location: 6865 W. Hickory Road, Elizabeth, Colorado 49060
- Coordinates: 39.3930°N 104.5652°W
- Type: Automobile museum
- Collection size: 400+ antique cars, major appliances, and more
- Website: ramblerranch.com

The Rambler Ranch, located in Elizabeth, Colorado, is home to the most extensive private collection of American Motors Corporation (AMC), predecessor company cars and trucks, as well as other vehicles and marketing memorabilia on display. It has prototypes, concepts, race cars, unique one-offs, and popular cars that span over a century of automotive history. The collection has hundreds of vehicles in buildings on the wooded property. It includes a restoration shop and facilities to showcase Kelvinator and other antique appliances, vintage clothing and accessories, a Sinclair gasoline station, a 1960s diner, and an entire apartment in authentic 1960s decor.

== Description ==
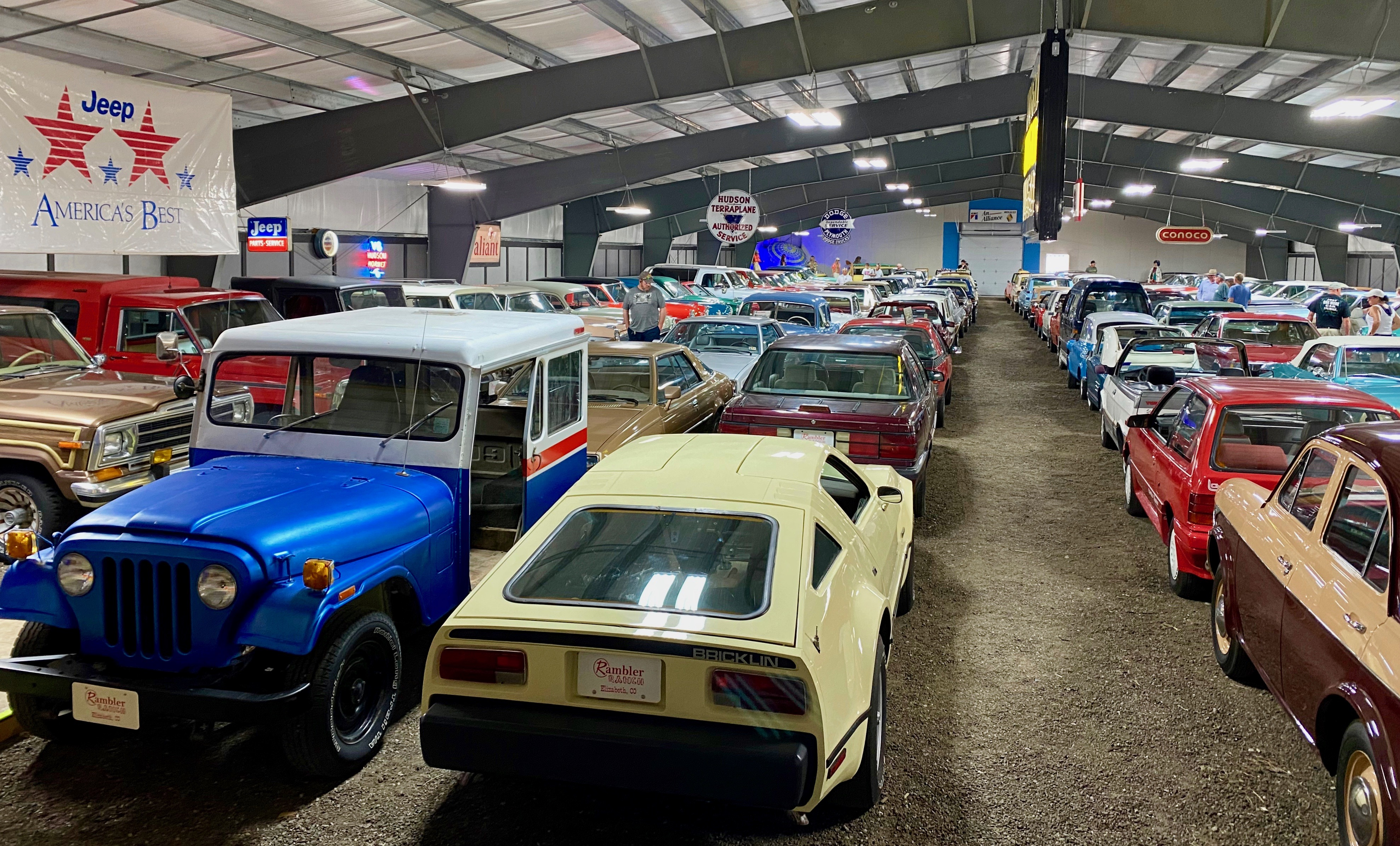
Cars in another building

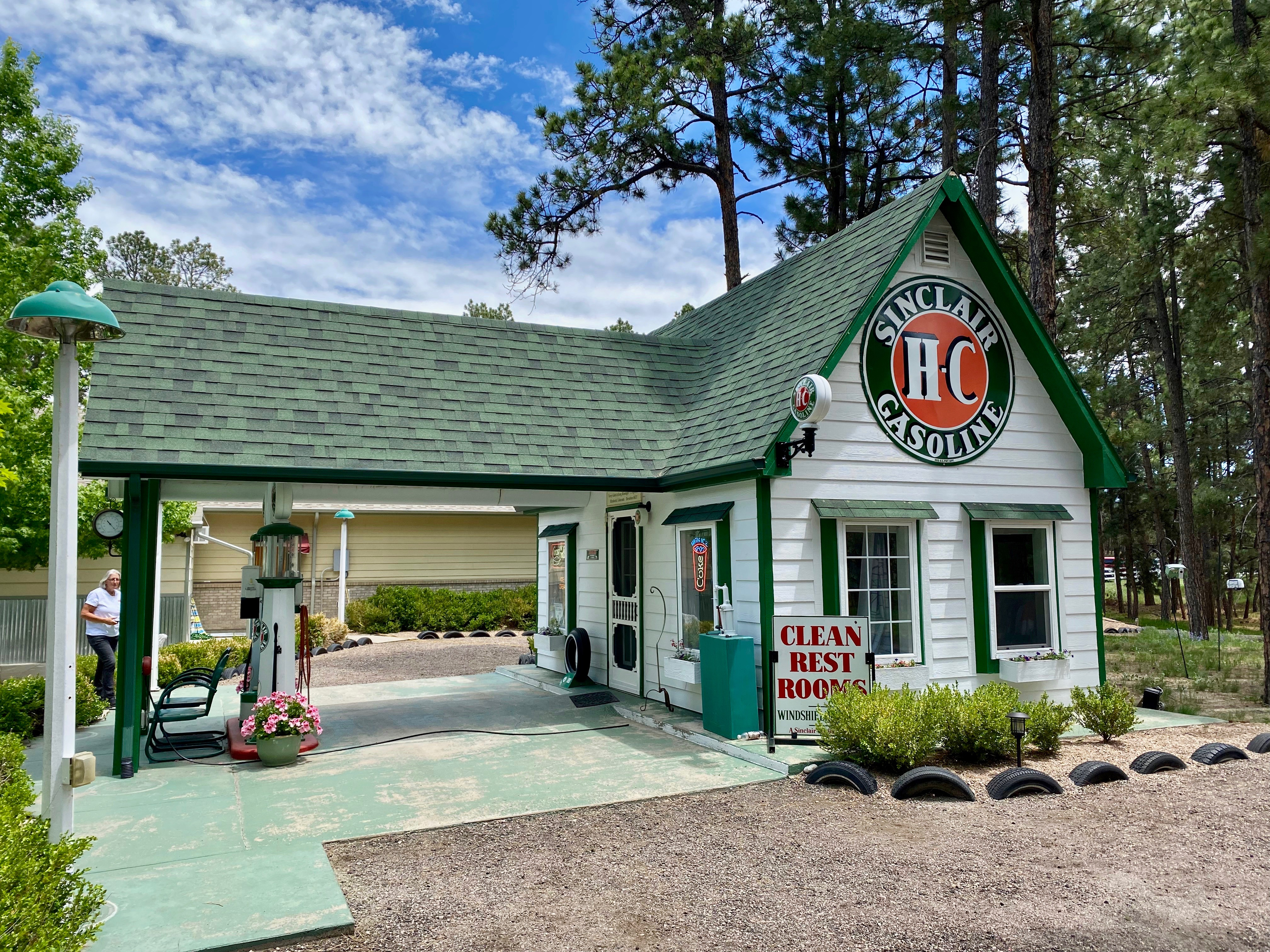
Sinclair gasoline station

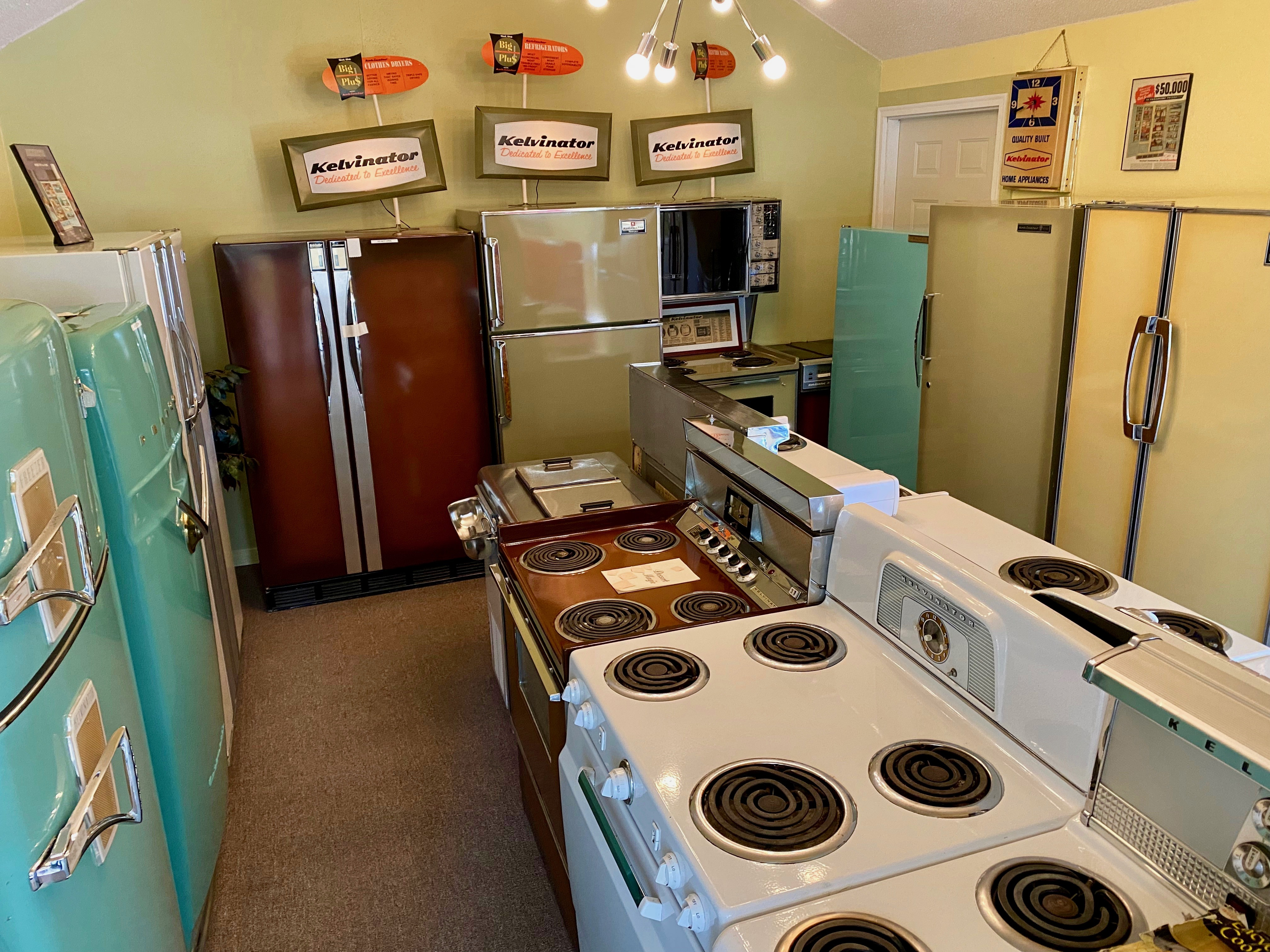
Part of the Kelvinator collection

The collection began in 1977 by Terry Gale and his father's 1954 Nash Ambassador. Gale's father purchased the used car in Utah for $50 to serve as inexpensive transportation. After the car broke down and was unused for 18 years until the early 1980s, Gale got the car running instead of hauling it to a junkyard.

After the car's restoration was completed, Gale went to car shows where the Nash attracted attention and thus began his quest to acquire additional cars. The collection quickly grew to around 30 vehicles and kept growing until Terry moved to a larger facility. In 1992, Gale and his partner set up on 5 acres (2.0 ha) in Elizabeth, Colorado. They soon expanded to 160 acres (65 ha) of land on the outskirts of the small town, approximately 45 miles (72 km) southeast of Denver. The first building was a 7,500-square-foot (697 m^{2}), which soon had a 5,000-square-foot (465 m^{2}) addition. An 18,000-square-foot (1,672 m^{2}) building was built to house AMC cars, and then a 16,000-square-foot (1,486 m^{2}) barn for additional unique vehicles. Other buildings and attractions include a building with antique major appliances made by Kelvinator and other brands, a re-created diner from the 1960s, and an apartment featuring 1960s furniture, decoration, and kitchen.

The collection's focus is on Rambler, Nash, and AMC vehicles, but the Rambler Ranch has over 60 other makes and unusual cars. Meetings of the local Metropolitan Car Club began in 1995, and the Rambler Ranch is open by appointment.

As of 2014, the Rambler Ranch has five substantial buildings, with the largest housing 107 AMC cars and memorabilia, as well as other buildings and "working garages". The facility and collection have been described as "Colorado's Best Kept Secret". It is "arguably the world's best car collection... It's the world's largest collection of AMC vehicles... where guests are treated to a unique historical experience." A picture of a small part of the collection is on the cover of Michael Milne's book entitled 75 Top Car Museums Europe & America. It is a "museum of Americana" as well as a remembrance of family and the iconic automobiles of the past.
