= St Leonards =

St Leonards may refer to:

== Places ==
=== Australia ===
- St Leonards, New South Wales
  - St Leonards railway station
- St Leonards, Tasmania, suburb of Launceston
- St Leonards, Victoria

=== Canada ===
- St. Leonard's, Newfoundland and Labrador

=== New Zealand ===
- St Leonards, Hawke's Bay, a suburb of Hastings
- St Leonards, Otago, a suburb of Dunedin

=== United Kingdom ===
- St Leonards, Buckinghamshire
- St Leonards, Dorset
- St Leonards-on-Sea, Hastings, East Sussex
- St Leonards, East Kilbride
- St Leonard's, Edinburgh
  - St Leonards (Edinburgh) railway station
- St Leonard's (ward), Lambeth, London
- Cholesbury-cum-St Leonards, Buckinghamshire
- Drayton St. Leonard, Oxfordshire
- Upton St Leonards, Gloucestershire
- St Leonard's, Exeter
- Parish of St Leonard, Eastcheap, City of London

== Churches ==
- St Leonard's Church (disambiguation)

== Schools and colleges ==
- St Leonard's Catholic School, Durham, England
- St Leonard's College (Melbourne), Australia
- St Leonard's College (University of St Andrews), Scotland
- St Leonards School, St Andrews, Scotland
- St Leonard's Secondary School, Glasgow, Scotland
- The St Leonards Academy, Hastings, England

== Arts and entertainment ==
- St. Leonards (album), 2018 album by Slowly Slowly
- St Leonards (band), an Australian alternative rock band

== Other uses ==
- Baron St Leonards, a title in the Peerage of the United Kingdom
- Leonard, a given name and surname

== See also ==
- Saint Leonard (disambiguation)
- Leonard (disambiguation)
- Leonards (disambiguation)
- St. Leonard (disambiguation)
