= Lennie (surname) =

Lennie is a surname, and may refer to:

- Angus Lennie (born 1930), Scottish actor
- Bárbara Lennie (born 1984), Spanish actress
- Eddie Lennie (born 1959), Australian football (soccer) referee
- Ernie Lennie (born 1953), Canadian cross-country skier
- Josh Lennie (born 1986), English footballer
- Oryssia Lennie, Canadian civil servant and minister
- Robert Aim Lennie (1889–1961), Professor of Midwifery
- William Lennie (c.1779–1852), Scottish grammarian
- Willie Lennie (1882–unknown), Scottish professional footballer
