= Oryssia Lennie =

Canadian civil servant

Oryssia J. Lennie CM, is a Canadian civil servant and former deputy minister of Western Economic Diversification Canada.

Lennie was appointed deputy minister for Western Economic Diversification Canada (WD) on November 1, 1997. Prior to joining WD, Lennie worked for the Alberta government for 26 years and was deputy minister of Federal and Intergovernmental Affairs from 1990 to 1997. She has had extensive involvement in constitutional and aboriginal constitutional negotiations and intergovernmental negotiations on social, economic, international trade, and internal trade policy.

A graduate of the University of Alberta, she has received numerous awards for her accomplishments in public service and in the area of business and management, including the Lieutenant Governor's Gold Medal for Excellence in Public Service in 2002 and the YWCA Women of Distinction Award in 1997.

Lennie is currently on the board of directors of the Canada West Foundation, which explores public policy issues of interest to western Canadians.

In December 2016, Lennie was named a Member of the Order of Canada.
