= Leonhart (surname) =

Leonhart is a surname. Notable people with the surname include:

- Carolyn Leonhart (born 1971), American jazz singer
- Jay Leonhart (born 1940), American double bassist and singer-songwriter
- Michael Leonhart (born 1974), American jazz trumpeter and multi-instrumentalist
- Michele Leonhart (born 1956), American law enforcement officer
- Squall Leonhart, a fictional character from the video game Final Fantasy VIII

== See also ==
- Leonard#Variations
- Leonard (disambiguation)
