= Rosedale Gardens Historic District =

Historic district in Michigan, United States

- U.S. National Register of Historic Places
- U.S. Historic district
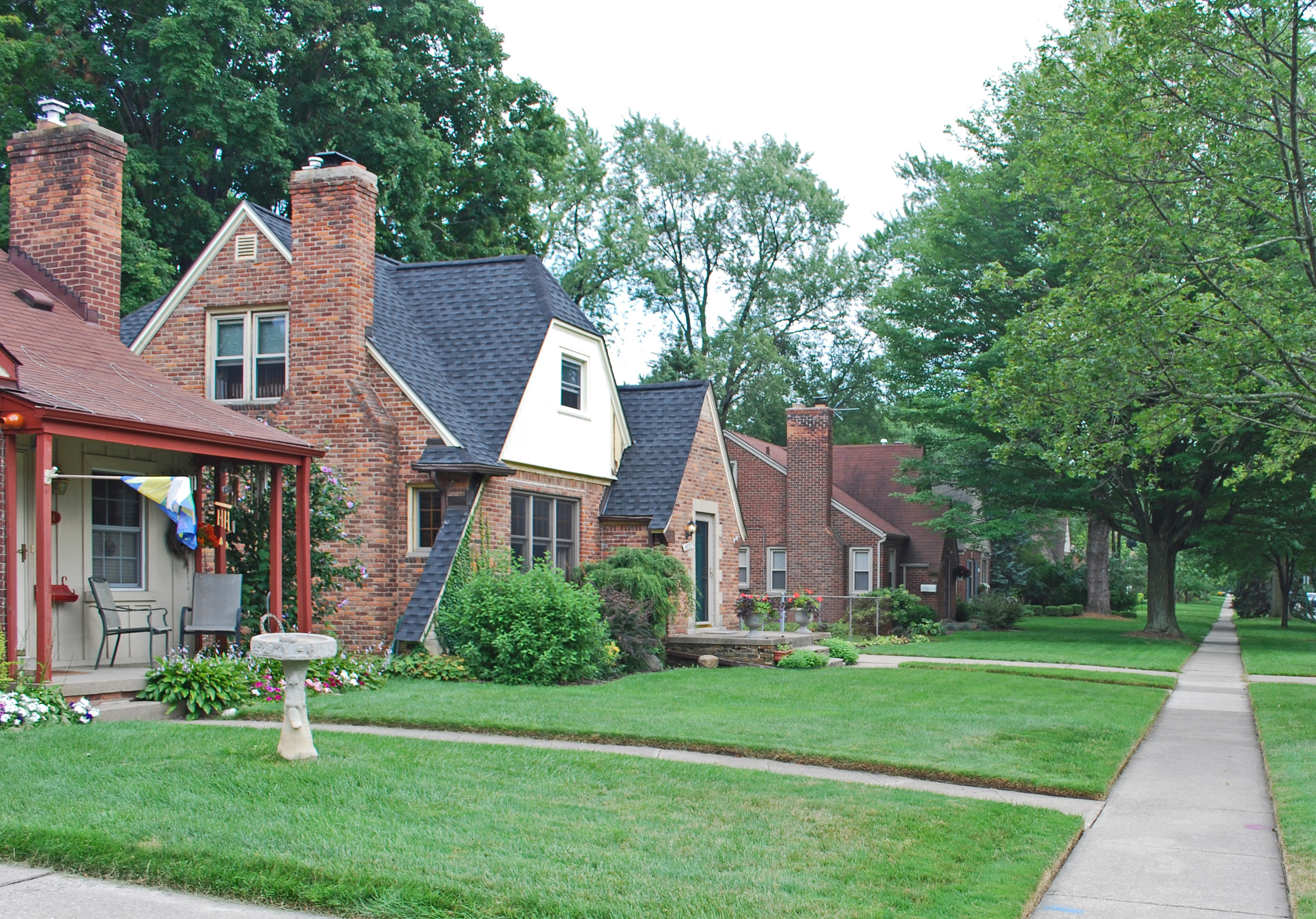
- Street scene on Melrose
- Interactive map
- Location: Arden St. to Hubbard St. between Plymouth Rd. and West Chicago St., Livonia, Michigan
- Coordinates: 42°21′54″N 83°21′29″W
- Built: 1925
- NRHP reference No.: 10000478
- Added to NRHP: July 19, 2010

The Rosedale Gardens Historic District (locally known as Old Rosedale Gardens) is a historic district located on eight streets, from Arden Street to Hubbard Street, between Plymouth Road and West Chicago Street in Livonia, Michigan. The district was placed on the National Register of Historic Places in 2010.

== History ==
Rosedale Gardens was platted by the Shelden Land Company in the 1920s as part of a residential development at Plymouth and Merriman Roads. The company modeled the development on Rosedale Park in Detroit. Shelden Sons promoted Rosedale Gardens as a residential community that offered access to Detroit while remaining separated from industrial expansion. Deed restrictions and controlled commercial development along Plymouth and Merriman Roads were used to guide the type and placement of development.

The first house in Rosedale Gardens was the Harsha house, built in 1925 and occupied in January 1926. A total of 61 houses were built in 1926, and by 1929, 121 homes had been constructed. Early community amenities followed, including a small grocery store with a gas pump in 1926, a school in 1927 on land donated by Shelden Sons Company, and Rosedale Gardens Presbyterian Church in 1928. The development marked the beginning of suburbanization in Livonia Township, although the Great Depression slowed construction and halted many nearby planned subdivisions.

When building resumed later in the 1930s, the developer bricked over existing homes and continued with brick construction. About 250 homes were built from 1935 to 1941, until World War II again interrupted construction. Among the late-1930s homes were several 1937 model houses on Cranston Street reportedly built by Kelvinator to promote central air conditioning. Construction increased again after the war, and by 1948 the original part of Rosedale Gardens contained 428 houses. Additional lots were platted and homes were built into the 1960s, including later Rosedale Gardens subdivisions and nearby Rosedale Meadows plats.

== Description ==
The Rosedale Gardens Historic District is a residential neighborhood, encompassing approximately 40 acres, containing about 570 houses, primarily built between 1925 and 1960. Houses are located along eight parallel streets running north–south. The streets are narrow and without curves and are lined with a collection of mature trees. Lots lining the streets are 40 feet wide and run 120 to 145 feet deep. Houses tend to be relatively modest in size, typically in the range of 1000 to 2000 square feet and one or two stories.

The neighborhood is distinctive because, unlike nearly all of the surrounding neighborhoods, pre-World War II houses predominate, with 428 of the 570 total built before the war. Many of the oldest houses are wooden, although brick-faced houses predominate in the neighborhood. Architectural styles are typically Colonials and English cottages, with some newer ranch houses intermingled.

Street scenes and neighborhood character

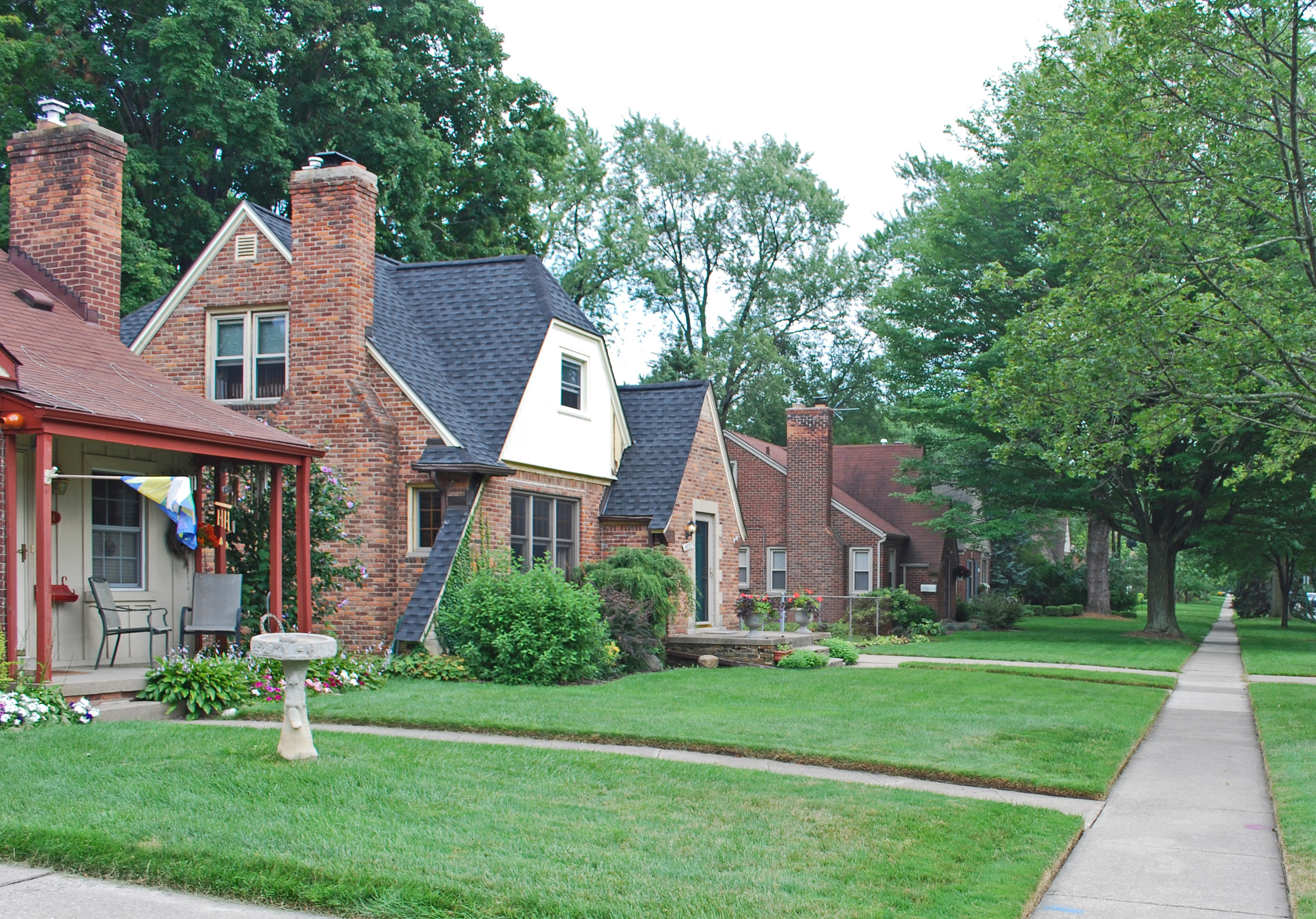
Street scene on Melrose

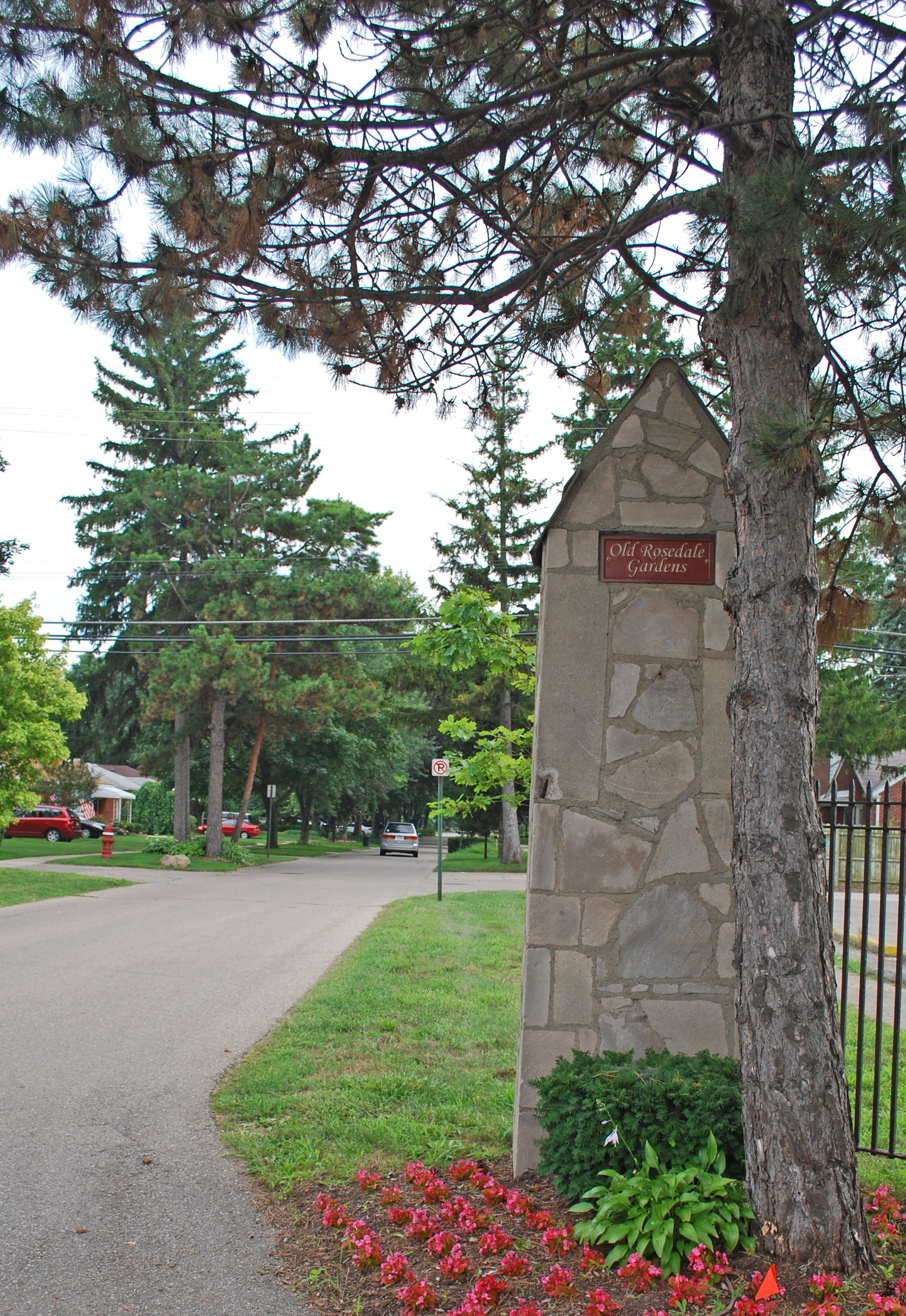
Entrance to the neighborhood at Berwick and Plymouth

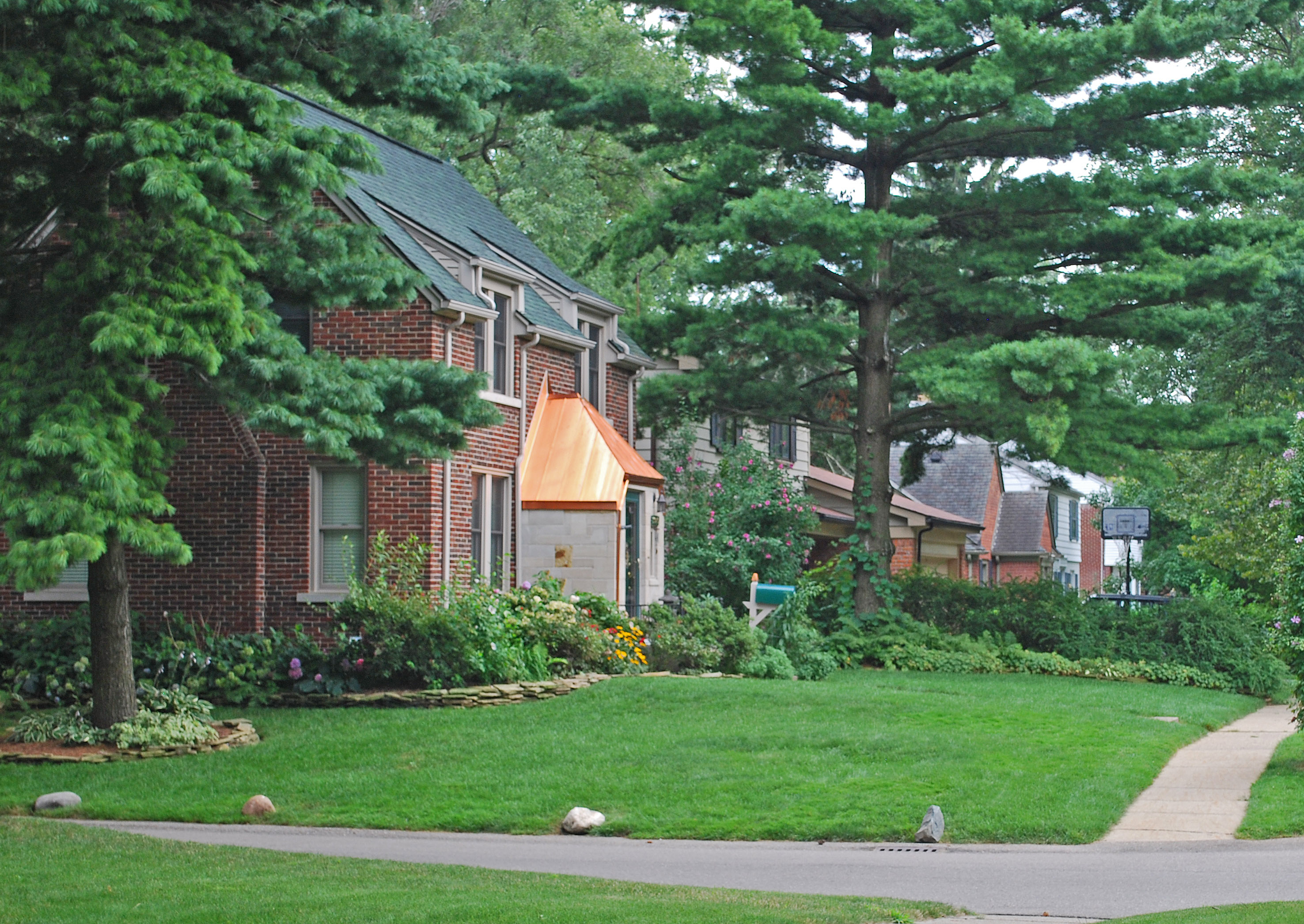
Street scene on Auburndale

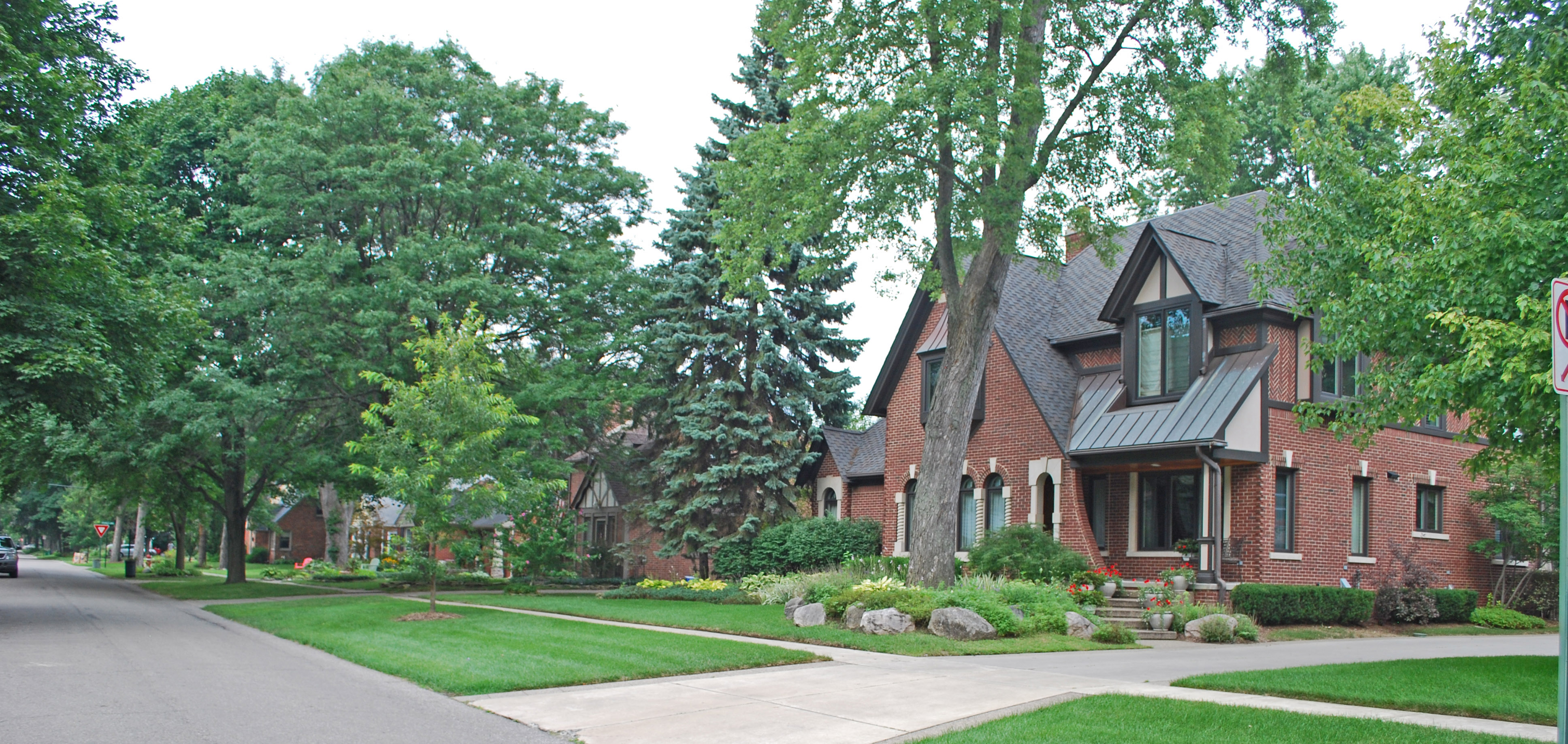
Street scene on Auburndale

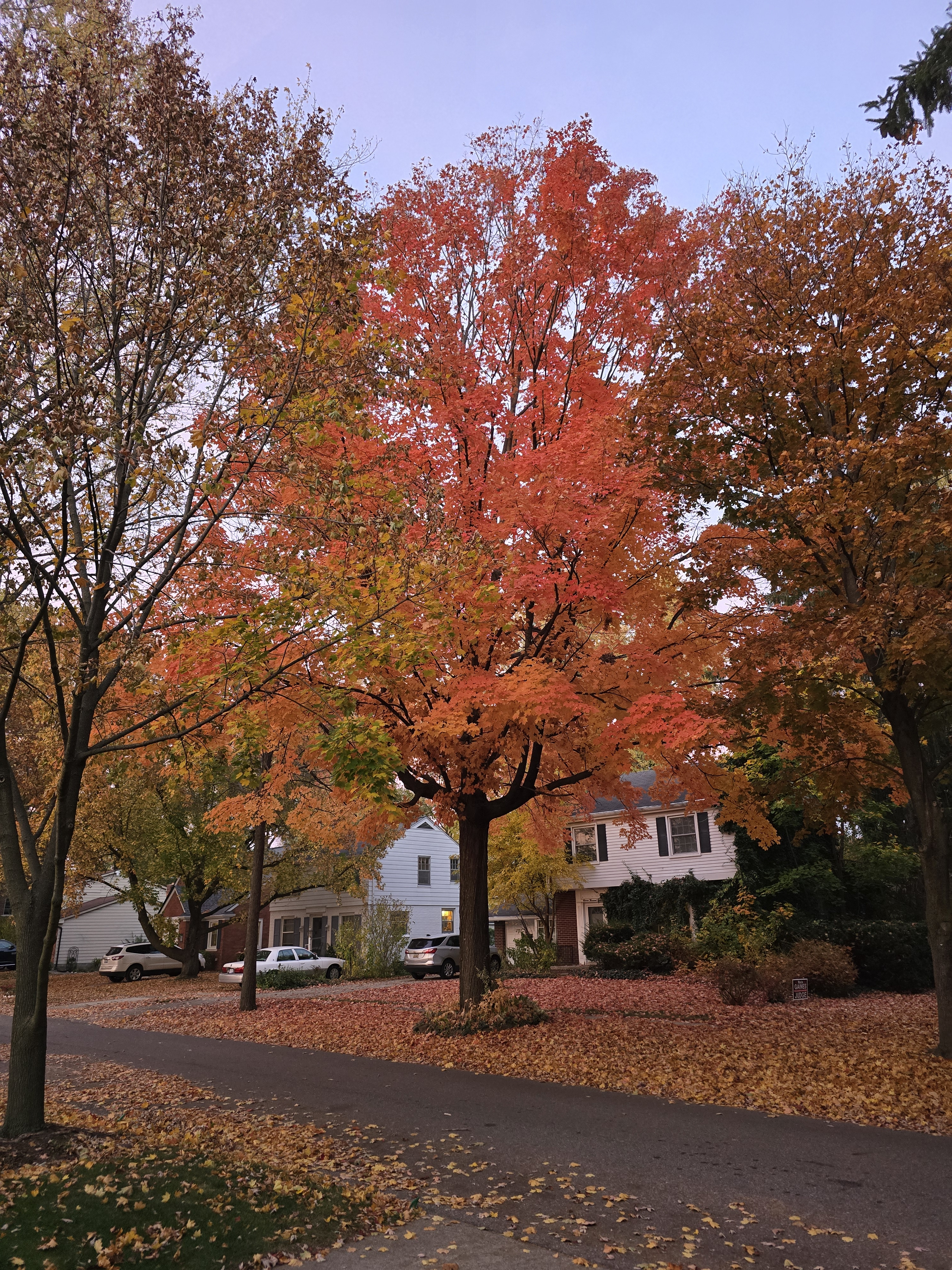
Autumn foliage in the Rosedale Gardens Historic District

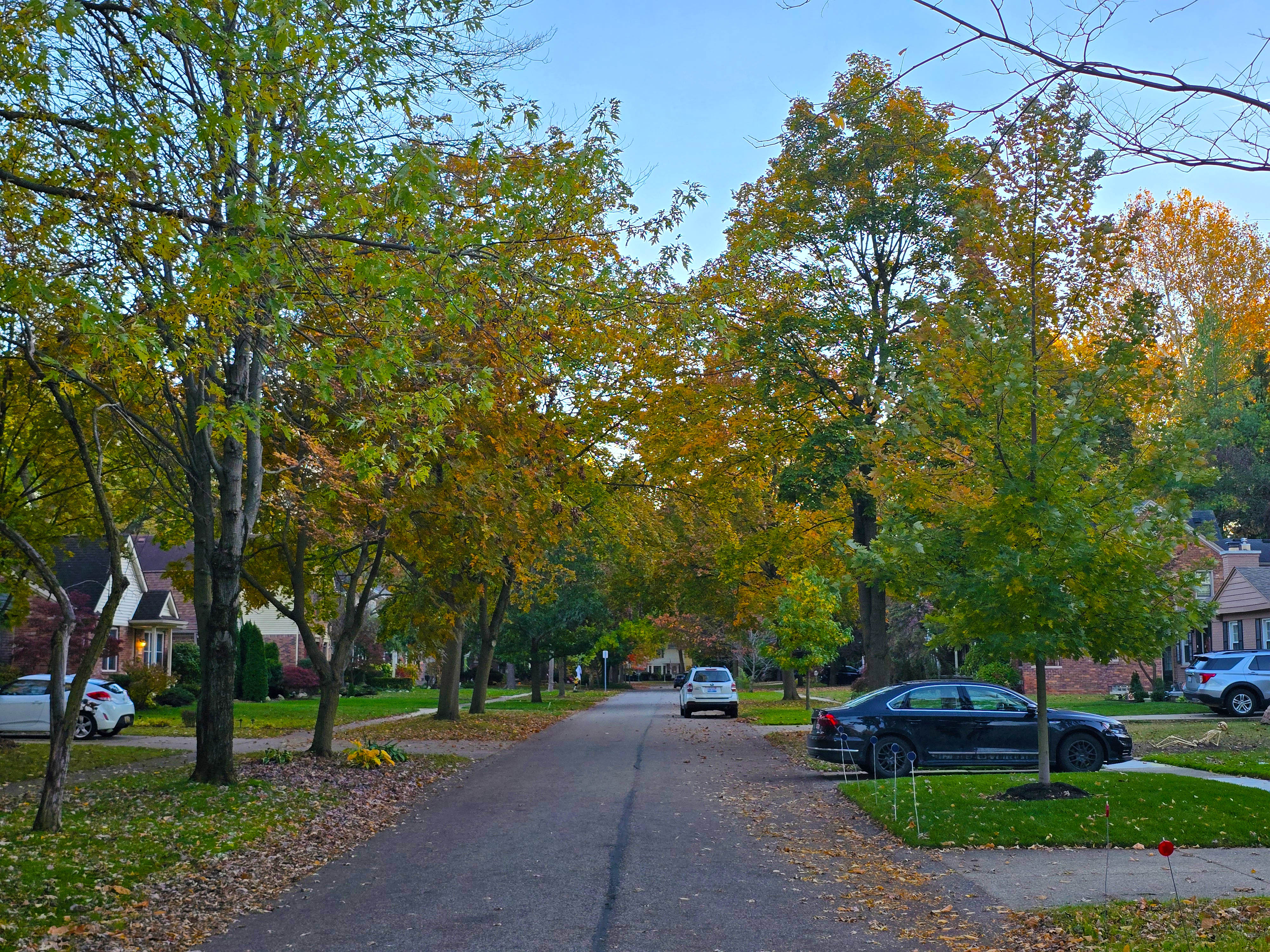
Autumn streetscape in the neighborhood

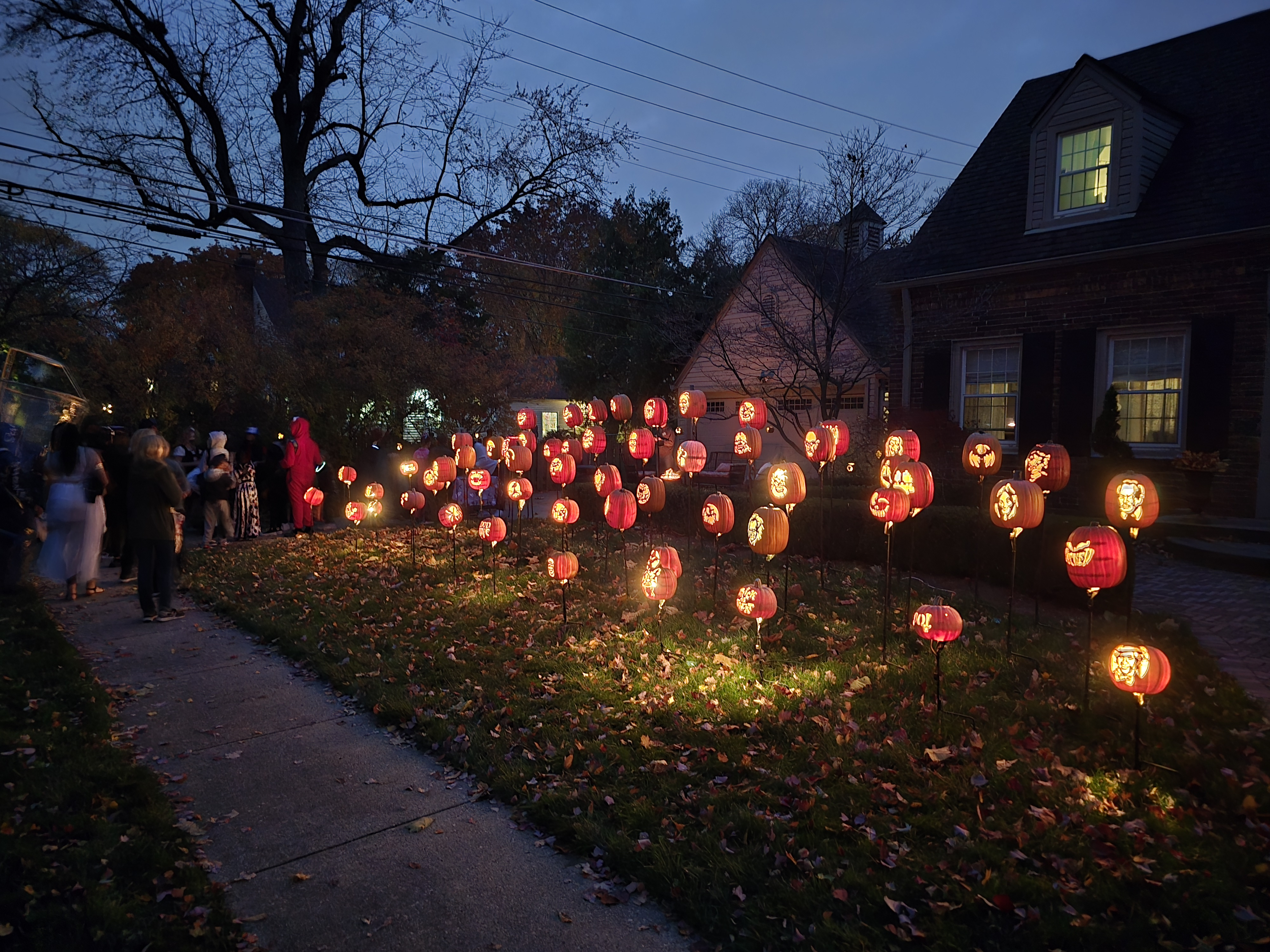
Halloween decorations in the neighborhood

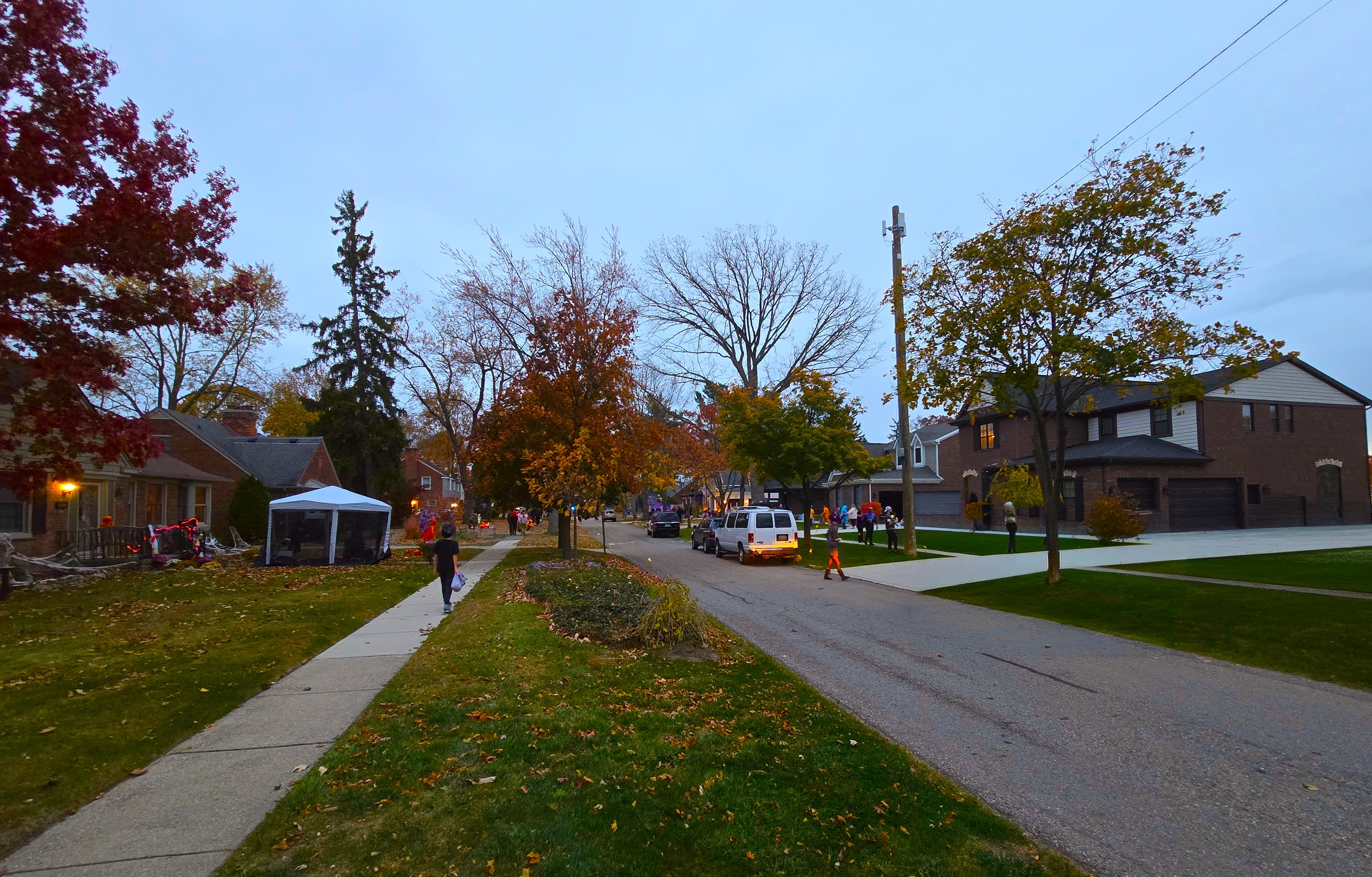
Residential street during Halloween festivities
