= Trudelies Leonhardt =

Dutch pianist

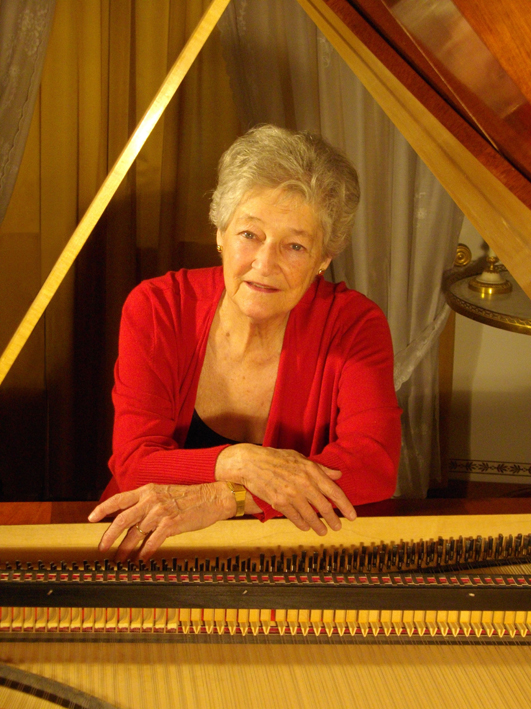
- Born: 30 May 1931 (age 95); Laren, Netherlands
- Occupation: Pianist

Trudelies Leonhardt (born 30 May 1931) is a Dutch pianist and fortepianist.

== Life ==
Trudelies Leonhardt was born into a musical family; her brother is harpsichordist Gustav Leonhardt. She began playing piano at age four under Johannes Röntgen's guidance.

She studied at the Amsterdam Conservatory with Nelly Wagenaar, earning her soloist diploma cum laude. Leonhardt won the Elizabeth Evert Prize and a prize from the Friends of the Concertgebouw. She continued her training in Paris with Yves Nat, and later with Marguerite Long.

Leonhardt has performed as a soloist with numerous orchestras, including the Royal Concertgebouw Orchestra (under Eugen Jochum), the Tonhalle-Orchester Zürich, the Limburgs Symfonie Orkest, the Orchestre de Chambre de Lausanne, the Musikkollegium Winterthur, and The London Mozart Players under Harry Blech. She has also given recitals and chamber music concerts.

In the 1970s, on her brother's advice, she began specializing in historical instruments, playing fortepianos from the late 18th and early 19th centuries. She recorded extensively on a Benignus Seidner fortepiano (Vienna, c. 1815), after initially owning an instrument by Karl Andreas Stein. She has lectured on the music of Franz Schubert, Beethoven, and historical piano performance.

== Discography (selection) ==
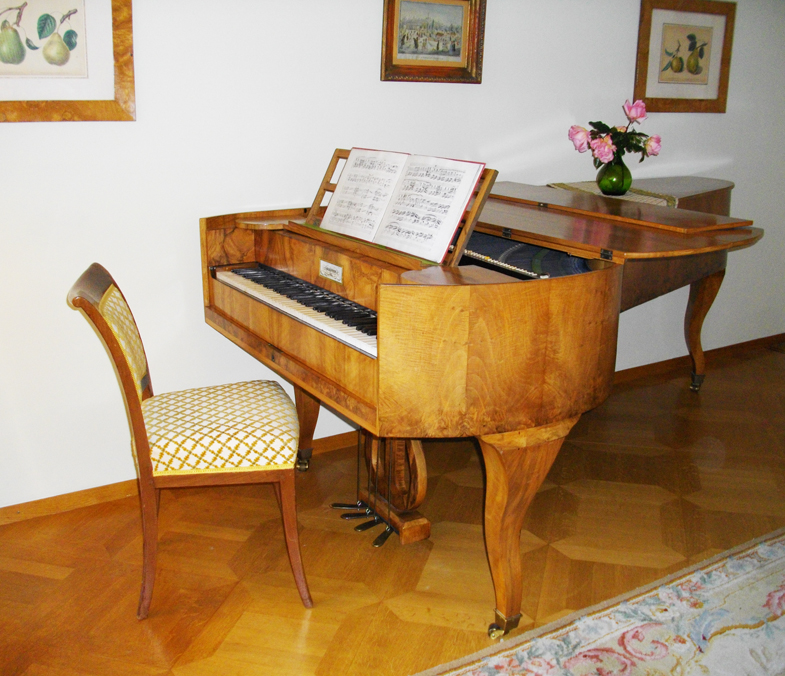
Fortepiano Benignus Seidner, Vienna 1815-20; personal instrument of Trudelies Leonhardt

=== Works by Anthon van der Horst ===
1963 HV 530 Tema con Variazioni in Modo Conjuncto

=== Works by Wolfgang Amadeus Mozart and Franz Schubert ===
1980 Arion 36578 (De kunst van Pianoforte) Mozart Sonata KV 576, Menuet KV 355; Schubert Sonata D 566, 17 Ländler D 366, Cotillon D 976

=== Works by Franz Schubert ===
1989 Jecklin J 4420/1-2, Vol. 1 (2 CDs) Sonatas D 959, D 784, D 845, D 894
1990 Jecklin J 4422/3-2, Vol. 2 (2 CDs) Sonatas D 958, D 960, D 664, D 850
1990 Jecklin J 4424/5-2, Vol. 3 (2 CDs) Sonatas D 557, D 568, D 537, D 575, D 566, D 459
1990 Div 31016 6 Moments musicaux D 780; Ländler and Cotillon D 681, D 679, D 976; 3 Klavierstücke D 946
1990 Div 31015 4 Impromptus D 935, 12 Wiener Deutsche D 128
1993 Div 31018 7 Deutsche D 366; Ländler D 145, D 366, D 970; 12 Ländler D 790; Menuet with 2 Trios D 335; Grätzer Walzer D 924
1994 Div 31019 Sonata D 157, 4 Impromptus D 899, 26 Écossaises D 618b, D 421, D 511, D 697, D 145, D 977, D 158
1996 Glo 5151 Menuet D 277a, Andante D 604, 12 Walzer D 145, Scherzo D 593 No. 2, 12 Écossaises D 299, Adagio D 612, Menuet D 334, 8 Écossaises D 529, Scherzo D 593 No. 1, 16 Ländler D 734
1997 Glo 5167 Sonata D 279, Adagio D 178, Erste Walzer D 365 (1–18), Variations on a theme by Hüttenbrenner D 576, Erste Walzer (19–36), Allegretto D 915

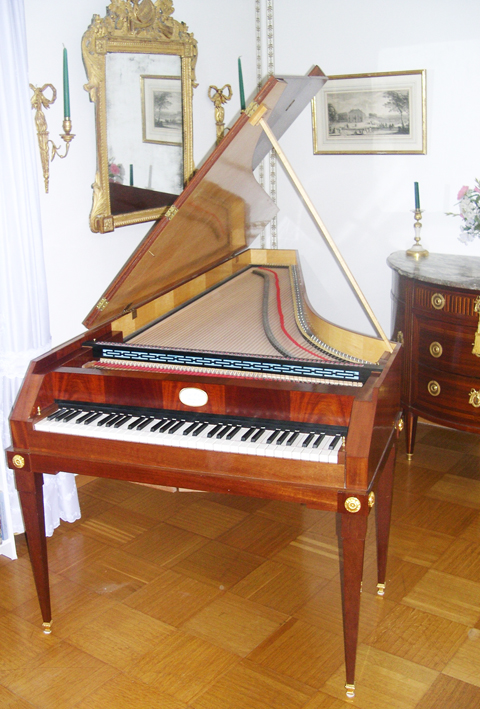
McNulty Fortepiano, copy after Anton Walter; personal instrument of Trudelies Leonhardt

=== Works by Robert Schumann and Felix Mendelssohn ===
1992 Meridian Duo cd 89024 Schumann: Arabeske Op. 18, Waldszenen Op. 82; Mendelssohn: Fantasia Op. 15, Lieder ohne Worte

=== Works by Felix Mendelssohn and John Field ===
1999 Vel 3010 Mendelssohn: Sonata Op. 105, Serious Variations Op. 54; Field: Sonata Op. 1 No. 1, Nocturnes 13, 18, 14

=== Works by Wolfgang Amadeus Mozart ===
2011 MO 0409 Fantasy KV 475, Sonata KV 457, Sonata KV 282, Sonata KV 332

=== Works by Ludwig van Beethoven ===
Released by Kingdom Records, London (UK)

1990 Kclcd 2022 Kurfürsten Sonata WoO 47 No. 2, 6 Bagatelles Op. 126, Sonata Op. 101
1992 Meridian Duocd 89023 32 Variations WoO 80, Sonata Op. 27 No. 1, Bagatelle WoO 56, Allegretto WoO 53, Rondo Op. 51 No. 2, 11 Bagatelles Op. 119
1996 Glo 5158 Andante WoO 57, Sonata Op. 28, 7 Bagatelles Op. 33, Bagatelle WoO 52
2009 Glo 5237 Sonata Op. 10 No. 3, 8 Variations WoO 76, Sonatina in F major (Kinsky–Halm Anh. 5b), Prélude WoO 55, Rondo (Kinsky–Halm Anh. 6), Klavierstück WoO 61a, Sonatina in G major (Kinsky–Halm Anh. 5a), 6 Variations WoO 77
2002 Vel 3052 Kurfürsten Sonata WoO 47 No. 1, Für Elise WoO 59, Sonata Op. 10 No. 1, Klavierstück WoO 60, Sonata Op. 26, Klavierstück WoO 61
2002 Vel 3055 Rondo Op. 51 No. 1, Sonata Op. 10 No. 2, Fantasia Op. 77, Variations on "Rule, Britannia!" WoO 79, 6 Écossaises WoO 83, Sonata Op. 90
2006 Gall CD 1190 6 Minuets WoO 10, Sonata Op. 31 No. 2, 10 Variations WoO 73, Sonata Op. 78
