= Leon Hart (disambiguation) =

Leon Hart was a college and National Football League defensive end.

Leon Hart may also refer to:

- Leon Hart (American football, born 1951), American football coach
- Leon Hart (offensive lineman) in USA Today All-USA high school football team (2000–09)

== See also ==
- Leonhart (disambiguation)
