= Leonard (appliances) =

Michigan based appliance company

The Leonard Company was founded in 1881 by Charles H. Leonard in Grand Rapids, Michigan.

== Beginnings ==
The famous Leonard "Cleanable" Refrigerator came about after a mishap in the Leonard home: a pail of hot cooling lard was left inside an icebox on top of a cake of ice, resulting in melted ice, a spilled pail and cooled lard spilled all over. Charles created his refrigerator with removable liners and flues. In 1885, Leonard introduced metal shelves and improved the door-locking mechanisms. 1907 saw the introduction of porcelain lined interiors, which further enhanced the cleanability and sanitation of refrigerators. The refrigerator cabinets were made of highly varnished carved-oak, brass fixtures, and enhanced with mirrors.

== Growth ==
Electrical refrigerators were introduced in 1918, and by 1925, Leonard was building one out of every five refrigerators produced in the United States, which amounted to 1000 refrigerators per day. Leonard merged with Kelvinator in 1926. The Leonard brand of appliances continued to be sold exclusively through Leonard dealers, as well as through Canadian and English dealers.
