= Nebbiuno =

- Comune
- Comune di Nebbiuno
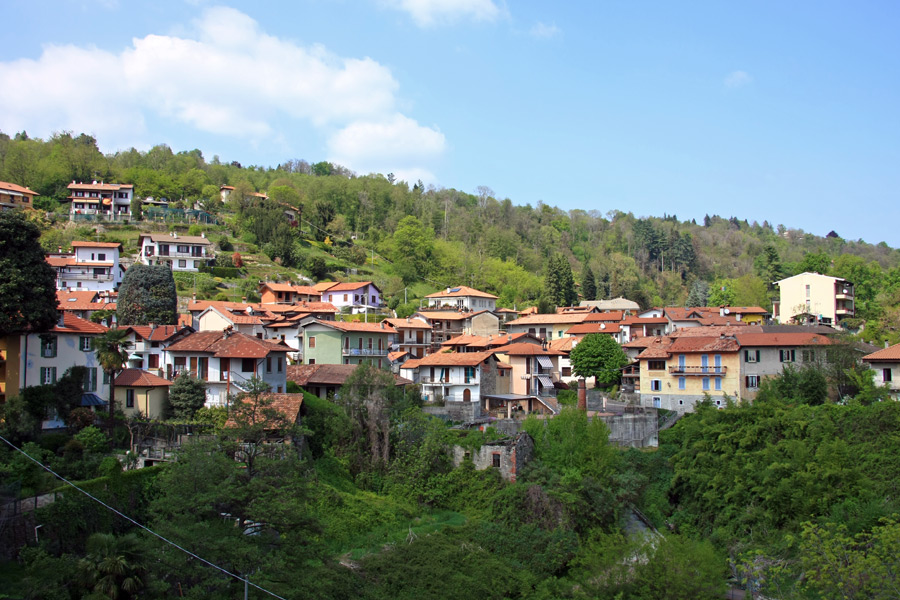
- View of Nebbiuno

- Location within Italy Location within Piedmont
- Coordinates: 45°48′N 8°32′E
- Country: Italy
- Region: Piedmont
- Province: Province of Novara (NO)

Area
  - Total: 8.2 km^{2} (3.2 sq mi)

Population (July 2024)
  - Total: 1,825
  - Density: 220/km^{2} (580/sq mi)
- Demonym: Nebbiunesi
- Time zone: UTC+1 (CET)
  - Summer (DST): UTC+2 (CEST)
- Postal code: 28010
- Dialing code: 0322
- ISTAT code: 003103

Nebbiuno is a comune (municipality) in the Province of Novara in the Italian region of Piedmont, located about 100 kilometres (62 mi) northeast of Turin and about 40 kilometres (25 mi) north of Novara. As of July 2024, it had a population of 1,825 and an area of 8.2 square kilometres (3.2 mi^{2}).

Nebbiuno borders the following municipalities: Armeno, Lesa, Massino Visconti, Meina, and Pisano.

Among the local churches are San Giorgio; Sant'Agata, Fosseno; San Leonardo, Tapigliano; Santi Nazaro e Celso, Corciago; and the Chiesetta della Madonna della Neve, Corciago.

== Demographic evolution ==
Historical population

Year	Pop.	±%
1861	1,596	—
1871	1,705	+6.8%
1881	1,684	−1.2%
1901	1,599	−5.0%
1911	1,491	−6.8%

Year	Pop.	±%
1921	1,422	−4.6%
1931	1,331	−6.4%
1936	1,213	−8.9%
1951	1,216	+0.2%
1961	1,139	−6.3%

Year	Pop.	±%
1971	1,126	−1.1%
1981	1,268	+12.6%
1991	1,299	+2.4%
2001	1,561	+20.2%

Source: Data from ISTAT
