= Lennie (barque) =

Canadian-built barque whose crew mutinied in 1875

History

United Kingdom
- Name: Lennie
- Owner: William W. Lovitt
- Port of registry: Yarmouth, Nova Scotia
- Route: Antwerp to New Orleans
- Laid down: Belliveau's Cove, Nova Scotia
- Launched: 1871
- Fate: Ran aground

General characteristics
- Class & type: barque
- Tons burthen: 984
- Propulsion: 3 masts
- Sail plan: full-rigged ship
- Crew: 16

The Lennie was a Canadian-built barque whose crew mutinied in 1875, en route to New York for orders.

== Crew ==
- Captain - Stanley Hatfield, 25, Riverdale, Yarmouth County, Nova Scotia
- First Mate - Joseph Wortley, Belfast
- Second Mate - Richard Macdonald, St. John
- Steward - Constant Van Hoydonck, 25, Belgium
- Steward's assistant - Henri Trousselot, 16, Rotterdam
- Able seamen - 11 men, late of the Dolphin

4 Greeks - Matteo Cargalis, 36; Parosios Leosis, 30; Pascales Caludis, 33; Giovanni Saros Moros, 31
3 Turks - Giovanni Carcaris, 21; George Kaida, 22; Georgeios Angelos, 19
Giuseppe Lettes, 22, Austrian
Boatswain - Giovanni Canesso, 34, Italian
Peter Petersen, 26, Dane
Charles Renken, English

== Voyage ==
The crew signed on in Antwerp on October 23, 1875. That day, the ship departed for Sandy Hook. During the first week, the crew ran out of tobacco. The captain had only enough for himself and did not share. By the 31st, The ship was at 49°4′N 6°35′W, going down the Channel against the headwinds, when the captain came on deck and ordered the ship about. The new crew fouled the braces, likely deliberately. The captain called out that the men were "not sailors, but soldiers".

=== Mutiny ===
At that point, Caladis stabbed the captain in the face and slashed his belly. Though wounded, the captain hit back with his fists and Caladis stabbed him again. Cargalis and the rest of the new crew arrived, and he stabbed the captain twice in the neck. Macdonald begged Canesso to spare him, but he was pushed away, and Caladis stabbed him twice. Wortley climbed the fore-rigging in an attempt to escape, but Cacaris, a Turk, shot at him from below and Kaida climbed above and also shot at him. They both fired a total of five times, causing Wortley to fall to the deck, where Cargalis nearly severed his head. Van Hoydonck attempted to give aid, but realised it was futile and stayed in his cabin. The crew weighted the three corpses and pitched them overboard.

The boatswain then confronted Van Hoydonck and Trousselot. They told them that they wished to get to Greece via Gibraltar. One of the crew had a rich uncle there, and they would scuttle the ship. Van Hoydonck agreed and came up on deck, which was liberally splashed with blood. He made two watches, with himself and Canesso. The crew scrubbed the deck and removed the ship's name. Van Hoydonck tried to set course for Lundy's Island, but Renken was wise. Being clever, he steered south and east, in the general direction of Gibraltar, but also of France.

A schooner was sighted the next day, but he was made to veer away. On November 4, he brought the ship into the bay of Sables d'Olonne. Caladis was suspicious, but agreed to a night's anchorage. He wrote a note in French and English about their situation, asking for help. They secretly dropped them overboard, hoping they would be found. Three were and one was produced at trial. At 5 the next morning, they set sail, despite a headwind. Then Van Hoydonck refused to navigate further. Petersen tried, but was incompetent. For the next two days they wandered lost. Then Van Hoydonck was called back on the evening of the 6th, but under condition that they would anchor at the next port he found. This was the Roads of La Flotte, where they anchored on the evening of November 7, telling the Greeks they were at Cádiz. In the night he made 20 copies of the previous note and put them overboard. He also hoisted the ensign, union down, a signal of distress.

A Frenchman, Réde, who had earlier steered the ship in, noticed the flag and came close to inquire. The flag was hauled down and Van Hoydonck was forced below. Cargalis acted as captain and made excuses. Their manner was suspicious, and he reported the ship to the Prefect of Marine.

On November 9, they asked Van Hoydonck what country it was and he told them it was a free republic with no police. Six went ashore in the longboat, with the clothing and effects of the murdered men. They said that they were shipwrecked sailors, but this was revealed as false and they were arrested. Angelos cracked and told the truth.

On the morning of November 10, a gunboat came alongside and told Van Hoydonck to send off his boat. He was resisted and drove the men in at the point of a pistol. After hearing Van Hoydonck's story, he sent him ashore to talk with the police and later gave him 10 armed sailors to arrest the remaining mutineers.

== Trial ==
After 6 weeks deliberations, the French courts surrendered jurisdiction and the crew was returned to London for trial at the Old Bailey.

They were tried first by Sir Thomas Henry, but later by Mr Justice Brett (Lord Esher). During the trial, the remains of the corpses of the murdered men washed up on the French coast. Van Hoydonck was sent to view them. They consisted of three heads, and one headless body. The fishermen who found the heads had buried them, and were unable to locate them again. The body was badly decomposed, and had been stabbed 16 times. It is supposed to be that of Stanley Hatfield.

Cargalis, Caladis, Cacaris, and Kaida were found guilty and hanged at Newgate on May 23, 1876. The rest were released.

=== Aftermath ===
The Lennie was taken to La Rochelle and then to Nantes from which she sailed with a new crew.

Justice Brett praised the actions of Van Hoydonck and ordered £50 paid to him for his conduct. The Aristocratic Order of St. John of Jerusalem awarded him a silver medal and Trousselot a bronze one. He later wrote a book about his experiences and worked as a gate-man at the Antwerp docks. Van Hoydonck owned a pub in Middlesex for a time, but was bankrupt by 1892.

Trousselot received the Legion of Honour from France and later moved to New Zealand, where he and others are remembered for aiding a double shipwreck in Timaru in May 1882.

The Lennie ran aground on Digby Neck in 1889.

== See also ==
- Saladin (barque)
