= San Leonardo, Tapigliano =

Church building in Nebbiuno, Italy

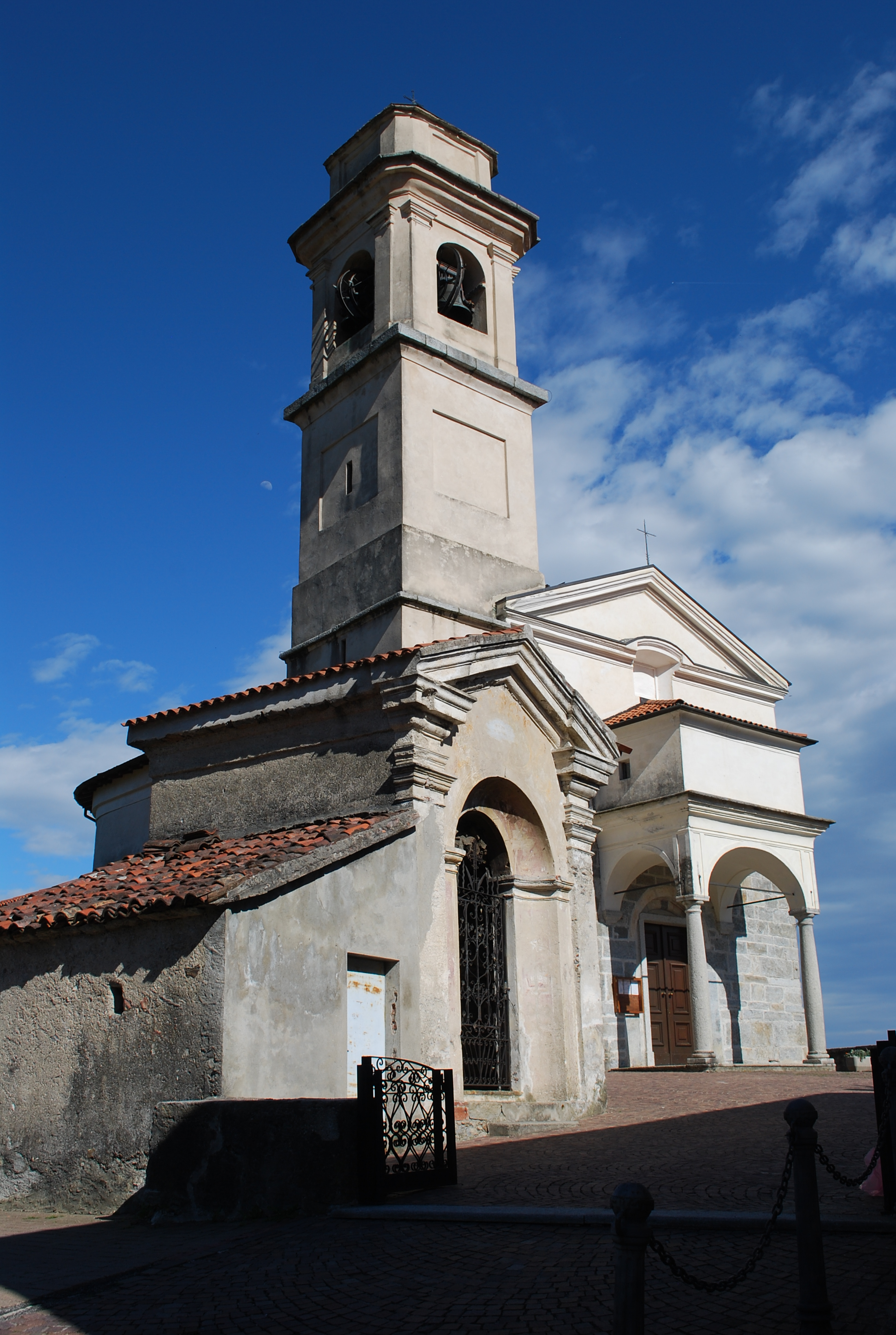

San Leonardo is a Roman Catholic parish church in a rural site in the frazione of Tapigliano, in the town limits of Nebbiuno, province of Novara, Piedmont, Italy.

== History ==
The Church of St. Leonard rises atop a hill between the rivers Valle and Selva Nocca in the Pissaccio valley. The dedication and the layout, with a façade facing east, suggest an early foundation, perhaps around the 10th century. Documents from the 13th century appear to refer to this church. However, it was only in 1819, that Cardinal Giuseppe Morozzo created the parish of Saint Leonard in Tapigliano, separating it from Sant'Eusebio in Pisano. In 1820, the church, bell tower and baptistery underwent reconstruction.
