= Leonardo =

Leonardo or The Leonardo may refer to:

== Arts and entertainment ==
- Leonardo (journal), an arts journal published by the MIT Press
- Leonardo (Italian magazine), a philosophy magazine published in Florence, Italy, in 1903–1907
- Leonardo (Teenage Mutant Ninja Turtles), one of the main characters in the Teenage Mutant Ninja Turtles franchise
- Leonardo (TV channel), an Italian television channel
- Leonardo (2011 TV series), a CBBC television series which centers around teenage Leonardo da Vinci played by Jonathan Bailey
- Leonardo (2021 TV series), an Italian-American television series
- Leonardo the Musical: A Portrait of Love, a 1993 musical
- Leonardo/ISAST, the International Society for the Arts, Sciences and Technology
- "The Leonardo", a 1933 short story written in Russian by Vladimir Nabokov
- Leonardo, the assistant of inventor Clyde Crashcup

== People ==
- Leonardo da Vinci (1452–1519), Italian polymath
- Leonardo Araújo, Brazilian former footballer and manager, most recently the sporting director of Paris Saint-Germain
- Leonardo (footballer, born 1974), Brazilian forward Leonardo Pereira da Silva (1974–2016)
- Leonardo (footballer, born 1976), Brazilian winger Leonardo dos Santos Silva
- Leonardo (footballer, born 1982), Brazilian striker Leonardo Gonçalves Silva
- Leonardo (footballer, born 1983), Brazilian winger Leonardo Vitor Santiago
- Leonardo (footballer, born March 1986), Brazilian centre-back Leonardo José Aparecido Moura
- Leonardo (footballer, born September 1986), Brazilian attacking midfielder Leonardo Rodrigues Perreira
- Leonardo (footballer, born 1987), Brazilian left-back Hugo Leonardo Pereira Nascimento
- Leonardo (footballer, born 1988), Brazilian centre-back José Leonardo Ribeiro da Silva
- Leonardo (footballer, born 1992), Brazilian forward Leonardo da Silva Souza
- Leonardo (footballer, born 1997), Brazilian forward Leonardo Nascimento Lopes de Souza

== Places ==
- Leonardo (St. Louis, Missouri), listed on the National Register of Historic Places listings in St. Louis, Missouri, United States
- Leonardo, New Jersey, United States
- The Leonardo (Sandton), Johannesburg, South Africa
- Fort Leonardo, Żabbar, Malta

== Science and technology ==
- Leonardo (dinosaur), a mummified Brachylophosaurus found in Montana
- Leonardo (moth), a genus of moths of the family Crambidae
- Leonardo (robot), a social robot created by the Personal Robots Group at the Massachusetts Institute of Technology
- Leonardo MPLM, a multi-purpose logistics module used to re-supply the International Space Station
- Leonardo (company), an aerospace and defence technology conglomerate headquartered in Italy
- Leonardo (supercomputer), a petascale supercomputer, currently under construction in Bologna
- CRV Leonardo, a Centre for Maritime Research and Experimentation research vessel
- The Leonardo (Salt Lake City), a science and art museum in Salt Lake City, Utah, United States
- Leonardo, an airline booking system owned by Rostec, a state-owned Russian conglomerate.
- 3000 Leonardo, an asteroid
- (523794) 2015 RR245, a trans-Neptunian object nicknamed Leonardo by Wesley Fraser

== See also ==
- Leonard (disambiguation)
- Leonardi (disambiguation)
- San Leonardo (disambiguation)
- Leo (disambiguation)
