= Electrolux Professional =

Swedish multinational professional appliance manufacturer

Electrolux Professional AB
- Company type: Publicly traded aktiebolag
- Traded as: Nasdaq Stockholm: EPRO B
- ISIN: SE0013747870
- Industry: Electronics
- Founded: 1962; 64 years ago
- Headquarters: Stockholm, Sweden
- Area served: Worldwide
- Key people: Kai Wärn (Chairman) Alberto Zanata (President and CEO)
- Products: Major appliances; Small appliances
- Brands: Electrolux Professional; Zanussi Professional; Molteni; Dito Sama; Alpeninox; Kelvinator Professional; Grindmaster; Unic; Veetsan; SPM Crathco
- Operating income: 592 million kr (2021)
- Total assets: 10,609 billion kr (2021)
- Total equity: 3,525 billion kr (2021)
- Owner: Investor AB (20.5%; 32.4% votes)
- Number of employees: 4,022 (2022)
- Website: www.electroluxprofessional.com

Electrolux Professional AB is a Swedish multinational professional appliance manufacturing company, headquartered in Stockholm. Originally formed as a division and later subsidiary of Electrolux, it was spun-off in March 2020. It produces a variety of products intended for professional consumers, while Electrolux remains more focused toward home consumers.

== History ==
In January 2018, Electrolux Professional acquired a German-Austrian supplier of laundry rental solutions for professional consumers. In October 2018, Electrolux Professional acquired SPM, an Italian manufacturer of frozen beverage equipment.

In April 2019, Electrolux Professional acquired Unic, a French manufacturer of the espresso machines.

In March 2020, Electrolux Professional has completed its spin-off from Electrolux. As a result, Electrolux Professional has been operated as an independent company and listed on Nasdaq Stockholm under the "EPRO" ticker symbol.

In October 2021, Electrolux Professional announced its intent to acquire Unified Brands from Dover Corporation for 2.14 billion kr or US$244 million. The acquisition was closed in December 2021.

== Products ==
Electrolux Professional produces a variety of major appliances for professional users, such as commercial kitchen equipments, espresso machines, beverage dispensers, washing machines, dryers, among others.
