= Léo =

Léo is a proper noun in French, meaning "lion". Its etymological root lies in the Latin word Leo.

Léo is used as a diminutive or variant of the names Léon, Léonard, Léonardon, Leonardo, Léonid, Léonor, Léonore, Eléonore, Léopold and Léonie, and in recent times has been adopted as a fully-fledged given name on its own.

The feminine variant is Léa.

The following people have the name Léo:

== In music ==
- Léo Arnaud (1904–1991), French-American film score composer
- Léo Chauliac (1913–1977), French jazz pianist, composer and conductor
- Léo Daniderff (1878–1943), French composer
- Léo Delibes (1836–1891), French composer
- Léo Ferré (1916–1993), French poet and singer-songwriter
- Léo Foguete (born 2004), Brazilian singer and songwriter
- Léo Marjane (1912–2016), French singer
- Léo Missir (1925–2009), French composer
- Léo Rispal (born 2000), French singer
- Léo Souris (1911–1990), Belgian composer, arranger, planner and conductor
- Léo Stronda (born 1992), Brazilian singer

== In sport ==
Football

- Léo (footballer, born 1975) (born 1975), Brazilian footballer
- Leonardo Silva (footballer, born 1980) (born 1980), Brazilian footballer
- Léo (footballer, born 1988) (born 1988), Brazilian footballer
- Léo (footballer, born 1990) (born 1990), Brazilian footballer
- Léo (footballer, born 1992) (born 1992), Brazilian footballer
- Léo Andrade (born 1998), Brazilian footballer
- Léo Artur (born 1995), Brazilian footballer
- Léo Bahia (footballer, born 1986) (born 1986), Brazilian footballer
- Léo Bahia (born 1994), Brazilian footballer
- Léo Baptistão (born 1992), Brazilian footballer
- Léo Bonatini (born 1994), Brazilian footballer
- Léo Borges (born 2001), Brazilian footballer
- Léo Carioca (born 1985), Brazilian footballer
- Léo Castro (born 1994), Brazilian footballer
- Léo Ceará (born 1995), Brazilian footballer
- Léo Chú (born 2000), Brazilian footballer
- Léo Cittadini (born 1994), Brazilian footballer
- Léo Condé (born 1978), Brazilian football manager
- Léo Cordeiro (born 1985), Brazilian footballer
- Léo Costa (born 1986), Brazilian footballer
- Léo Duarte (born 1996), Brazilian footballer
- Léo Dubois (born 1994), French footballer
- Léo Eichmann (born 1936), Swiss footballer
- Léo Fioravanti (born 1992), Brazilian footballer
- Léo Fortunato (born 1983), Brazilian footballer
- Léo Gago (born 1983), Brazilian footballer
- Léo Gamalho (born 1986), Brazilian footballer
- Léo Gomes (born 1997), Brazilian footballer
- Léo Gonçalves (born 1989), Brazilian footballer
- Léo Inácio (born 1976), Brazilian footballer
- Léo Itaperuna (born 1989), Brazilian footballer
- Léo Jabá (born 1998), Brazilian footballer
- Léo Jardim (born 1995), Brazilian footballer
- Léo Júnior (born 1954), Brazilian footballer
- Léo Kanu (born 1988), Brazilian footballer
- Léo Lacroix (born 1992), Swiss footballer
- Léo Lelis (born 1993), Brazilian footballer
- Léo Leroy (born 2000), French footballer
- Léo Lima (born 1982), Brazilian footballer
- Léo Maceió (born 1987), Brazilian footballer
- Léo Matos (born 1986), Brazilian footballer
- Léo Medeiros (born 1981), Brazilian footballer
- Léo Mineiro (born 1990), Brazilian footballer
- Léo Morais (born 1991), Brazilian footballer
- Léo Moura (born 1978), Brazilian footballer
- Léo Natel (born 1997), Brazilian footballer
- Léo Ortiz (born 1996), Brazilian footballer
- Léo Passos (born 1999), Brazilian footballer
- Léo Paulista (born 1983), Brazilian footballer
- Léo Pelé (born 1996), Brazilian footballer
- Léo Pereira (born 1996), Brazilian footballer
- Léo Pereira (born 2000), Brazilian footballer
- Léo Pétrot (born 1997), French footballer
- Léo Pimenta (born 1982), Brazilian footballer
- Léo Jaime da Silva Pinheiro (born 1986), Brazilian footballer
- Léo Príncipe (born 1996), Brazilian footballer
- Léo Rodrigues (born 1991), Brazilian footballer
- Léo Rodrigues (born 1999), Portuguese footballer
- Léo Rigo (born 1995), Brazilian footballer
- Léo Rocha (born 1985), Brazilian footballer
- Léo San (born 1982), Brazilian footballer
- Léo Santos (born 1998), Brazilian footballer
- Léo Schwechlen (born 1989), French footballer
- Léo Sena (born 1995), Brazilian footballer
- Léo Silva (born 1985), Brazilian footballer
- Léo Simas (born 1998), Brazilian footballer
- Léo Tilica (born 1995), Brazilian footballer
- Léo Veloso (born 1987), Brazilian footballer

Other sports

- Léo Bergère (born 1996), French triathlete
- Léo Chuard (born 1998), Swiss ice hockey player
- Léo Dandurand (1889–1964), American-Canadian ice hockey coach and owner
- Léo Le Blé Jaques (born 1997), French snowboarder
- Léo Lacroix (skier) (born 1937), French alpine skier
- Léo Martins (born 1989), Brazilian-born Portuguese beach soccer player
- Léo Rooman (1928–2019), Belgian field hockey player
- Léo Rossi (born 1999), French badminton player
- Léo Seydoux (born 1998), Swiss footballer
- Léo Vieira (born 1976), Brazilian submission grappler and Brazilian jiu-jitsu instructor
- Léo Vincent (born 1995), French cyclist
- Léo Westermann (born 1992), French basketball player

== Other occupations ==
- Léo, pseudonym of Brazilian comics writer Luiz Eduardo de Oliveira (born 1944)
- Léo Apotheker (born 1953), German business executive
- Léo Battesti, Corsican politician
- Léo Bergoffen (1922–2020), Jewish emigrant from Nazi Germany to France
- Léo Bérubé (1884–1967), Canadian lawyer and politician
- Léo Brière (born 1994), French mentalist and illusionist
- Léo Bureau-Blouin (born 1991), Canadian politician
- Léo Cadieux (1908–2005), Canadian politician, Minister of National Defense from 1967 to 1970
- Léo Campion (1905–1992), French actor and anarchist
- Léo Collard (1902–1981), Belgian politician
- Léo Errera (1858–1905), Belgian botanist
- Léo Gausson (1860–1944), French painter and printmaker
- Léo Gauthier (1904–1964), Canadian Member of Parliament
- Léo Hamon (1908–1993), French politician
- Léo Joannon (1904–1969), French film director and writer
- Léo Lagrange (1900–1940), French Under-Secretary of State for Sports and Recreation under the Popular Front
- Léo Laporte-Blairsy (1865–1923), French sculptor
- Léo Lasko (1885–1949), German screenwriter and film director
- Léo Legrand, French actor
- Léo Lévesque, Canadian poet, essayist and writer
- Léo Major (1921–2008), Canadian Army soldier
- Léo Malet (1909–1996), French crime novelist and surrealist writer
- Léo Marion (1899–1979), Canadian scientist
- Léo Pétillon (1903–1996), Belgian civil servant and lawyer in the Belgian Congo
- Léo Piquette (born 1946), Canadian politician
- Léo Pons (born 1996), French filmmaker
- Léo Quievreux (born 1971), French comic book writer and illustrator
- Léo Richer Laflèche (1888–1956), Canadian general, civil servant, diplomat and politician
- Léo Rocco (1894–1976), Swiss architect
- Léo Schnug (1878–1933), Alsatian painter and illustrator
- Léo Staats (1877–1952), French ballet dancer, choreographer and director
- Léo Taxil (1854–1907), French writer and journalist
- Léo Testut (1849–1925), French physician and anatomist
- Léo d'Ursel (1867–1934), Belgian diplomat
- Léo Valentin (1919–1956), French adventurer

== See also ==
- Léa (disambiguation)
- Léo (disambiguation)
- Leo (given name)
- Leo (surname)
