= Leo =

Leo is the Latin word for lion. It most often refers to:

- Leo (constellation), a constellation of stars in the night sky
- Leo (astrology), an astrological sign of the zodiac
- Leo (given name), in several languages, usually masculine

Leo or Léo may also refer to:

== Acronyms ==
- Lateral epitaxial overgrowth, a semiconductor substrate technology
- Law enforcement officer
- Law enforcement organisation
- Louisville Eccentric Observer, a free weekly newspaper in Louisville, Kentucky
- Michigan Department of Labor and Economic Opportunity
- Legal Ombudsman, often informally abbreviated to LEO or LeO in the UK

== Arts and entertainment ==
=== Music ===
- Leonie Whyman, Australian singer and actress (stage name "LEO")
- L.E.O. (band), formed by musician Bleu and collaborators
- Leo (singer) (born 1990), South Korean pop musician
- Leo (soundtrack), by Anirudh Ravichander for the 2023 Indian film

=== Film ===
- Leo (2000 film), a Spanish film
- Leo (2002 film), a British-American film
- Leo, a 2007 Swedish film by Josef Fares
- Leo (2012 film), a Kenyan film
- Leo (2023 American film), an American animated musical comedy
- Leo (2023 Indian film), an Indian Tamil-language action thriller starring Vijay
- Leo the Lion (MGM), mascot of the Metro-Goldwyn-Mayer film studio seen at the beginning of MGM films

=== Television ===
- Leo Awards, a British Columbian television award
- "Leo", an episode of Being Erica
- Léo, fictional lion in the animation Animal Crackers
- Léo, 2018 Quebec television series created by Fabien Cloutier
- Ultraman Leo, 1974 Japanese television show produced by Tsuburaya Productions

== Companies ==
- Leo Namibia, former name for the TN Mobile phone network in Namibia
- Leo Pharma, an international pharmaceutical company, based in Denmark
- Leo Records, an English jazz record label
- Lioré et Olivier, a French aircraft manufacturer from 1912 to 1937
- The Leo Group, a waste-recycling company based in Halifax, England

== People ==
=== Names ===
- Léo, a list of people with the given name
- Leo (surname), a list of people

=== Footballers ===
- Léo (footballer, born 1975), full name Leonardo Lourenço Bastos, Brazilian football leftback
- Leo (footballer, born November 1989), full name Leonardo Passos Alves, Brazilian football striker
- Leo (footballer, born December 1989), full name Leandro Mariano da Silva, Brazilian football striker
- Léo (footballer, born 1990), full name Leonardo da Silva Vieira, Brazilian football goalkeeper
- Léo (footballer, born 1992), full name Leonardo José Peres, Brazilian football forward

=== Other people ===
- Pope Leo (disambiguation), listing popes named Leo
- Leonid dynasty, also known as the House of Leo, a Byzantine dynasty
- Arakel Babakhanian (1860–1932), known by his pen name Leo, Armenian historian
- Leonie Whyman, Australian singer and actress (stage name "LEO")
- Leo (singer) (born 1990), South Korean pop musician
- Leo (wrestler) (born 1989), Mexican professional wrestler
- Luiz Eduardo de Oliveira or Léo (born 1944), Brazilian comics writer

== Places ==
- Léo Department, a department or commune of Sissili Province in southern Burkina Faso
  - Léo, Burkina Faso, the capital city of Sissili Province and Léo Department
- Leo, a village that was merged into Leo-Cedarville, Indiana, U.S.
- Leo, Ohio, U.S.
- Leo, West Virginia, U.S., a ghost town
- Leo Islands, Nunavut, Canada

== Science and technology ==
=== Astronomy and space exploration ===
- Low Earth orbit, a satellite path
- Launch and Early Orbit phase, a crucial phase of a space mission
- LEO (spacecraft), a lunar mission
- Amazon Leo, a satellite constellation and internet service provider

=== Biology ===
- Leo (horse), an American Quarter Horse
- Leonberger or Leo, a breed of dog
- Long-term Ecosystem Observatory, a marine study project
- Leo, an obsolete genus now in Panthera

=== Computing ===
- LEO (computer), the first commercially used computers
- Leo (text editor), a computer program

== Sports ==
- BC Lions or Leos, a Canadian Football League team
- The PBA Leo Awards, annual Philippine Basketball Association awards

== Other uses ==
- LEO (website), a group of dual-language dictionaries and discussion forums
- Leo Petroglyph, a series of ancient stone carvings
- Leo clubs, youth branch of Lions Clubs International
- Leo, one of the most popular cat names for a pet domestic cat

== See also ==
- Leo the Lion (disambiguation)
- Leos (disambiguation)
- Lio (disambiguation)
- St. Leo (disambiguation)
- Leonardo (disambiguation)
