= Drunkard Morning (TV series) =

2025 Iranian television series

- Persian: بامداد خمار
- Genre: Historical drama; Romance
- Based on: Bamdad-e Khomar by Fattaneh Haj Seyed Javadi
- Written by: Hossein Kiani
- Directed by: Narges Abyar
- Starring: Tarlan Parvaneh; Navid Pourfaraj
- Ending theme: "Bamdad-e Khomar" by Mohsen Chavoshi
- Country of origin: Iran
- Original language: Persian
- No. of seasons: 2
- No. of episodes: 27

Production
- Producer: Mohammad Hossein Qasemi
- Cinematography: Pouyan Kafili
- Editor: Majid Asheghi
- Running time: 46–78 minutes

Original release
- Network: Sheyda
- Release: 20 October 2025 – present

Drunkard Morning (Persian: بامداد خمار, romanized: Bamdad-e Khomar) is an Iranian historical romance television series directed by Narges Abyar and produced by Mohammad Hossein Qasemi. Based on the 1995 novel Bamdad-e Khomar by Fattaneh Haj Seyed Javadi, the series was written by Hossein Kiani. It follows the life of Mahboubeh, a young woman from an aristocratic family whose forbidden romance with a working-class carpenter's apprentice challenges social conventions and family expectations.

Plans to adapt Bamdad-e Khomar were first reported in the mid-2010s. In February 2024, Abyar was announced as the series' director, while Mohammad Davoudi was initially attached as the screenwriter. During production, the project underwent several changes, including Davoudi's departure following creative differences, screenplay revisions, reports of damage to the Jameh Mosque of Qazvin filming location, the omission of production credits from promotional billboards, and the departure of actor Ali Mosaffa. Principal photography began in 2024, with the series planned as a three-season adaptation.

The first season premiered on the Sheyda streaming platform on 20 October 2025. The second season premiered on 13 July 2026.

== Premise ==
The series unfolds across two parallel timelines: the late Qajar period and the early Pahlavi era, around the outbreak of World War I, and the 1980s during the Iran–Iraq War. It centres on a forbidden cross-class romance between Mahboubeh, a young woman from the wealthy and aristocratic Khansalar family, and Rahim, a working-class carpenter's apprentice. The relationship is mirrored across both timelines as it faces opposition from the family, class prejudice, and patriarchal social norms.

In the earlier timeline, the narrator's aunt once fell in love with a young man from a lower social class, but the relationship ended in disappointment and tragedy. In the present-day storyline, another young woman from the family embarks on a similar romance, prompting the aunt to confront the repetition of her own past as she struggles between warning her niece and supporting her choices.

== Cast and characters ==
=== Main characters ===
- Tarlan Parvaneh as Mahboubeh, a young woman from a wealthy Tehran family whose independent spirit and personal aspirations bring her into conflict with her family's expectations and the social conventions of her time.
- Navid Pourfaraj as Rahim, a working-class carpenter's apprentice whose background and outlook differ significantly from those of Mahboubeh and her family.
- Laleh Eskandari as Nazanin, Mahboubeh's mother, a traditional woman who places great importance on family values, social standing, and her daughters' futures.
- Ali Mosaffa as Basir al-Molk, Mahboubeh's father and the head of a wealthy and prominent Tehran family. He is an educated and influential man whose decisions are shaped by both traditional values and the changing society around him.
- Reza Kianian as Hessam al-Molk, Mahboubeh's paternal uncle and an influential member of the extended family who takes an active interest in family affairs.
- Golab Adineh as Zivar, Rahim's mother, a working-class woman known for her street performances and her distinctive way of life.
- Gelareh Abbasi as Nozhat, Mahboubeh's elder sister and a member of the Basir al-Molk family.
- Marjaneh Golchin as Dayeh, Mahboubeh's longtime nursemaid, who has a close connection with the family and its household.
- Behnoush Bakhtiari as Dadeh, a servant in the Basir al-Molk household who forms part of the family's everyday domestic life.
- Hamid Sefat as Aslan, the son of Ata od-Dowleh and a young man from a wealthy and influential family.
- Hossein Kiani as Ata od-Dowleh, Aslan's father, a wealthy and influential figure with business connections to Basir al-Molk.
- Sheida Yousefi as Tavous, the daughter of a servant who grows up in the Basir al-Molk household and is familiar with the family's daily life.
- Ali Nafisi as Nasir Khan, Nozhat's husband and a member of the extended family through marriage.
- Danial Poursabah as Mansour, Mahboubeh's cousin and a medical graduate who has returned from France.
- Farzaneh Farnam as Khojasteh, Mahboubeh's younger sister and a member of the Basir al-Molk family.

=== Recurring characters ===
- Ehteram Boroumand as Older Mahboubeh
- Elmira Dehghani as Soudabeh
- Parivash Nazarieh as Aunt Keshvar
- Rozita Ghaffari as Eftekhar ol-Molouk
- Linda Kiani as Esmat
- Kazem HajirAzad as Moshir od-Dowleh
- Solmaz Ghani as Naz Banoo
- Behnaz Jafari as Shazdeh Khanom
- Zahra Farahani as Nimtaj
- Ardeshir Rostami as Dr. Giti Ara

== Production ==
=== Development ===
Plans for a television adaptation of Bamdad-e Khomar, the bestselling novel by Fattaneh Haj Seyed Javadi, date back to 2018, when director Hassan Fathi was reportedly offered the project but declined. Directors Kianoush Ayari and Amirhossein Asgari were also reported as potential candidates for the adaptation.

Screenwriter Mohammad Davoudi began developing the project in March 2021 as head writer.

In February 2024, following the completion of filming for Savushun, Narges Abyar was announced as the director of the adaptation. At the time, Mohammad Davoudi was attached as screenwriter and Hassan Mostafavi as producer, while Tarlan Parvaneh and Sina Mehrad were announced among the lead cast.

=== Screenplay changes ===
In June 2024, Davoudi announced his withdrawal from the project, citing what he described as "fundamental and unauthorized" alterations to the screenplay, unprofessional conduct by the new production team, and breaches of contractual commitments. He stated that revisions had been made without his knowledge, argued that the resulting screenplay no longer met professional standards, and requested that his name not be used in the series' credits or promotional materials. Davoudi also stated that the screenplay had been officially registered with the Iranian Alliance of Motion Picture Guilds and argued that substantial revisions without his consent violated the rights of the original author.

Producer Hassan Mostafavi described the dispute as a temporary disagreement that would eventually be resolved.

The series' public relations office rejected Davoudi's claims, stating that he had been informed from the outset that revisions to the screenplay would be required and that, under the terms of his contract, the director had the authority to implement such changes. According to the producers, Davoudi's screenplay departed significantly from the source novel and remained unfinished after three years of development. They further stated that only limited revisions had been made in order to preserve the spirit of the original novel and claimed that Davoudi had declined opportunities for professional collaboration after the appointment of the new director.

Davoudi's version of the screenplay was subsequently abandoned. Mohammad Hossein Qasemi replaced Mostafavi as producer, while playwright Hossein Kiani joined the project after meetings with Abyar in late 2023 and early 2024, becoming the series' new screenwriter.

=== Filming ===
Principal photography began in 2024 in the historical city of Qazvin, with several scenes filmed at heritage sites throughout the city. In July 2024, rapper and actor Hamid Sefat joined the cast.

In December 2024, the production announced the principal cast, including Tarlan Parvaneh, Navid Pourfaraj, Ali Mosaffa, Reza Kianian, Golab Adineh, Golareh Abbasi, Laleh Eskandari, Marjaneh Golchin, Behnaz Bakhtiari, Behnaz Jafari, Parivash Nazarieh, Ehteram Boroumand, Rozita Ghaffari, Kazem Hajirazarad, and Hamid Sefat.

Filming for the second season began during the winter of 2024.

In April 2025, reports emerged alleging that soot applied to a brick wall of the Jameh Mosque of Qazvin during filming had damaged the historic monument. Officials from the Qazvin Cultural Heritage Department stated that the material used was a removable artificial soot that would not permanently damage the structure. Following the controversy, Minister of Cultural Heritage, Tourism and Handicrafts Seyyed Reza Salehi Amiri ordered an official inspection of the filming location.

In November 2025, production of the third and final season was announced. The following month, Ali Mosaffa departed the series before filming of the third season. According to reports, his departure resulted from financial disagreements between the actor and the Sheyda streaming platform.
