= Leo (given name) =

Leo is a given name in several languages. In European languages, it is usually a masculine given name and it comes from the Latin word leo, which in turn comes from the Greek word λέων meaning "lion". It can also be used as a short form of other names that begin with Leo-, such as Leonard, Leonardo, Leonidas, or Leopold, and occasionally Llywellyn.

The name can refer to:

== People ==
=== Religious figures ===
- Pope Leo, fourteen popes
  - Pope Leo XIV (born 1955), incumbent pope
- List of saints named Leo
- Leo of Constantinople (fl. 1134–1143), Patriarch of Constantinople
- Leo Rajendram Antony (1927–2012), 4th Bishop of Trincomalee
- Leo Baeck (1873–1956), German rabbi, scholar, and theologian
- Leo Zhedenov (1883–1959), member of the Russian apostolate

=== Rulers ===
- Emperor Leo, seven Byzantine emperors
- King Leo, five Armenian kings
- Leo I, Prince of Armenia (died 1140)

=== Scientists ===
- Leo Esaki (born 1925), Japanese physicist and Nobel laureate
- Leo Kadanoff (1937–2015), American physicist
- Leo Stodolsky, physicist
- Leó Szilárd (1898–1964), Jewish Hungarian-American physicist

=== Sports ===
==== Association football ====
- Leo Andersson (born 2004), Finnish footballer
- Leo Beenhakker (1942–2025), Dutch football manager
- Leo Bosschart (1888–1951), Dutch footballer
- Leo Chambers (born 1995), English footballer
- Leo Fortune-West (born 1971), English footballer
- Leo Krupnik (born 1979), Ukrainian-born American-Israeli former soccer player and current soccer coach
- Leo Kyllönen (born 2004), Finnish footballer
- Leo Messi (born 1987), Argentine footballer
- Leo Østigård (born 1999), Norwegian footballer
- Leo Walta (born 2003), Finnish footballer

==== Other sports ====
- Leo Atang (born 2007), English professional boxer
- Leo Baker (skateboarder) (born 1991), American skateboarder
- Leo Barry (born 1977), Australian rules footballer
- Leo Cantor (1919–1995), American NFL football player
- Leo Chenal (born 2000), American football player
- Leo Durocher (1905–1991), American baseball player and manager
- Leo Franciosi (born 1932), Sammarinese sports shooter
- Leo Hilokoski (born 1941), Finnish bowler
- Leo Klein Gebbink (born 1968), Dutch field hockey player
- Leo Koloamatangi (born 1994), American football player
- Leo Komarov (born 1987), Finnish ice hockey player
- Leo Lööf (born 2002), Swedish ice hockey player
- Leo Mazzone (born 1948), pitching coach for the Atlanta Braves and the Baltimore Orioles
- Leo McCrea (born 2003), British-Swiss Paralympic swimmer
- Leo Merle (born 1998), American Paralympic athlete
- Leo Monahan (sportswriter) (1926–2013), American sports journalist
- Leo Nomellini (1924–2000), American football player in both the College and Pro Football Halls of Fame
- Leo Peelen (1968–2017), Dutch track cyclist
- Leo Prantner (born 2001), Italian handball player
- Leo Rivas (born 1997), Venezuelan baseball player
- Leo Visser (born 1966), Dutch ice speed skater
- Leo van Vliet (born 1955), Dutch road bicycle racer

=== Artists and entertainers ===
- Leo Arnaud (1904–1991), French-American composer
- Leo de Berardinis (1940–2008), Italian stage actor and theatre director
- Leo de Bever (1930–2015), Dutch architect
- Leo G. Carroll (1886–1972), English actor
- Leo Chiosso (1920–2006), Italian lyricist
- Leo F. Forbstein (1892–1948), American film musical director and orchestra conductor
- Leo Gorcey (1917–1969), American actor
- Leo Howard (born 1997), American actor and martial artist
- Leo von König (1871–1944), German painter
- Leo Kottke (born 1945), American finger-style guitarist
- Leo Ku (born 1972), Hong Kong singer and actor
- Leo Leandros (1923–2025), Greek musician, composer, and producer
- Leo Lee (born 2002), Australian singer-songwriter and member of South Korean boy band Alpha Drive One
- Leo Monahan (artist) (born 1933), American paper artist
- Leo Rosten (1908–1997), American humorist
- Leo Saussay (born 1990), Thai actor and singer
- Leo Sayer (born 1948), British-born Australian pop musician
- Leo Tolstoy (1826–1910), Russian novelist

=== Politicians ===
- Leo Andy (born 1938), Guadeloupean politician
- Leo von Caprivi (1831–1899), German general and Chancellor of Germany
- Leo Fernando (1895–1954), Sri Lankan Sinhala businessman, Member of Parliament for Buttala Electoral District
- Leo Keke (1947–2012), Nauruan politician
- Leo McAdam (1930–2024), Canadian politician
- Leo Parskey (1915–1994), justice of the Connecticut Supreme Court
- Leo Ryan (1925–1978), California Congressman killed at Jonestown
- Leo Varadkar (born 1979), Irish politician and Tánaiste

=== Other ===
- Leo of Tripoli (died after 921/2), Greek renegade and admiral for the Abbasid Caliphate
- Leo Africanus (c. 1494 – c. 1554?), Andalusian Berber Moorish diplomat and author
- Leo Burnett (1891–1971), American advertising executive
- Leo Catozzo (1912–1997), Italian film editor
- Leo Fender (1909–1991), American inventor, maker of electric guitars
- Leo Frank (1884–1915), American Jew murdered by a lynch mob
- Leo Jogiches (1867–1919), Russian Marxist revolutionary
- Leo Krim (2010–2012), American child killed along with his sister Lucia by their nanny
- Leo Laporte (born 1956), American technology broadcaster and author
- Leo Lee Tung-hai (1921–2010), Chairman of the Board of the Tung Wah Group of Hospitals from 1970–1971, businessman and philanthropist in Hong Kong
- A. Leo Levin (1919–2015), American law professor
- Leo Loudenslager (1944–1997), American world champion aerobatics aviator
- Leo Sauvage, French journalist
- Leo Schuster (1791–1871), German-born British cotton-trader and merchant banker
- Leo Strauss (1899–1973), American political philosopher

== Fictional characters ==
- Leo Corbett (Power Rangers), on the television series Power Rangers: Lost Galaxy
- Leo Jones (Doctor Who), on the television series Doctor Who
- Leo Kliesen, a German spelunker in the Tekken series
- Leo Kovalensky, from the novel We the Living by Ayn Rand
- Leo McGarry, on the television series The West Wing
- Leo Fitz, on the television series Agents of S.H.I.E.L.D., played by Iain De Caestecker
- Leo Wong, the father of Amy Wong on the television series Futurama
- Leo Valdez, a son of Hephaestus from Rick Riordan's The Heroes of Olympus fantasy novel series
- Leo Wyatt, on the television series Charmed
- Uncle Leo, on the television series Seinfeld
- Leo (That '70s Show), on the television series That '70s Show, played by Tommy Chong
- Leo (comics), in the Marvel universe
- Leo (Yu-Gi-Oh! 5D's), in the manga series Yu-Gi-Oh!
- Leo, a character in the Doubutsu Sentai Zyuohger

== See also ==
- Léo
- Leo (surname)
- Leon (given name)
