= A Time in Eternity =

2026 Iranian-British science fiction drama film directed by Mehdi Norowzian

- Directed by: Mehdi Norowzian
- Written by: Mehdi Norowzian; Sepideh Ghorbani; Ali Asghari
- Produced by: Niki Karimi
- Starring: Leila Hatami; Babak Hamidian; Navid Pourfaraj; Bita Farahi
- Cinematography: Masoud Salami
- Edited by: Esmaeil Alizadeh
- Music by: Arash Gouran
- Release date: September 2, 2026 (L'Étrange Festival)
- Running time: 96 minutes
- Countries: Iran; United Kingdom
- Language: Persian

A Time in Eternity (Persian: زمانی در ابدیت, romanized: Zamāni dar Abadiyat) is a 2026 Iranian-British science fiction drama film directed by Mehdi Norowzian, and written by Norowzian, Sepideh Ghorbani and Ali Asghari. The film stars Leila Hatami, Babak Hamidian, Navid Pourfaraj, Abbas Ghazali, Bita Farahi, Taranom Kermanian and Marjan Ettefaghian, with Niki Karimi as producer. The film was shot entirely in Iran and had its world premiere in the International Competition section of L'Étrange Festival in Paris in September 2026.

== Plot ==
Maryam's husband, Saeed, mysteriously disappears, leaving her and their 12-year-old daughter in a state of uncertainty. Maryam continues to hope that he will return, but the disappearance places increasing strain on her relationship with her daughter. At the same time, she faces unwanted attention from her brother-in-law.

As Maryam's search for her missing husband continues, strange phenomena and a mysterious presence enter her life. Her journey gradually becomes an exploration of grief, repression and self-discovery, while the film uses a speculative and metaphorical approach to examine social pressures surrounding women, masculinity, religion and tradition in contemporary Iran.

== Cast ==
- Leila Hatami as Maryam
- Babak Hamidian as Saeed
- Navid Pourfaraj as Vahid
- Abbas Ghazali as the Man of the Sea
- Bita Farahi as Maryam's mother
- Tarnom Karmaniyan as Sayeh
- Marjan Etefaghian as Bajilan

== Production ==
=== Development ===
A Time in Eternity was directed by Iranian-British filmmaker Mehdi Norowzian. The film marked his return to feature filmmaking after approximately two decades. Norowzian had previously directed the feature film Leo and the short film Killing Joe, for which he received an Academy Award nomination.

The screenplay was written jointly by Norowzian, Sepideh Ghorbani and Ali Asghari. Niki Karimi served as producer.

The project was announced in Iran in 2022, with Leila Hatami attached to star. Contemporary reports described the film as a drama with metaphysical and science-fiction elements.

=== Filming ===
The film was shot entirely in Iran over the course of 87 days. Filming took place in Tehran, Qeshm Island, Varzaneh and Mazandaran, among other locations.

Masoud Salami served as cinematographer. The film was edited by Esmaeil Alizadeh, with original music by Arash Gouran.

== Release ==
A Time in Eternity was initially expected to be considered for the 43rd Fajr International Film Festival. The film was listed among the films associated with the festival, but it was ultimately not included in the festival's final screening schedule after failing to submit a final exhibition copy by the announced deadline.

The film had its world premiere in the International Competition section of L'Étrange Festival in Paris on 2 September 2026. The festival lists the film as a 96-minute Iranian-British science fiction drama.
