= Leonardo Rodrigues =

Leonardo Rodrigues may refer to:

- Léo Rodrigues (footballer, born 1991), Brazilian football right-back
- Léo Rodrigues (footballer, born 1999), Portuguese football goalkeeper
