= Lateral epitaxial overgrowth and pendeo-epitaxy =

Semiconductor substrate technology

Lateral epitaxial overgrowth (LEO), and the derived pendeo-epitaxy (PE), are selective area growth (SAG) techniques for epitaxial growth of wide bandgap semiconductor materials, particularly gallium nitride (GaN). These techniques are characterized by growing each crystal layer laterally from initially vertically grown columns. Since these lateral growths or "wings" do not directly contact the substrate layer, crystallographic defects caused by the difference in crystal structure between the substrate and epitaxial growth are minimized.

Defect-free growth of wide-bandgap semiconductor materials has applications in semiconductor device fabrication, where such materials are used for electronic devices which must tolerate high-power, high-frequency, or high-temperature operation. Crystal layers of low defect density are correlated with improved device characteristics and performance. Epitaxy of such materials where the epitaxial growth material (i.e. GaN) is in direct contact with the substrate seed material (such as GaN on silicon carbide (SiC), GaN on sapphire (Al_{2}O_{3}) substrate, and GaN on silicon (Si) substrate.) can produce a high density of structural defects, mainly edge and screw dislocations and stacking faults. PE and LEO have been observed to reduce densities of dislocation by two to four orders of magnitude when compared to non-lateral growth techniques and therefore are of interest to material scientists and semiconductor manufacturers.

== Lateral epitaxial overgrowth (LEO) ==
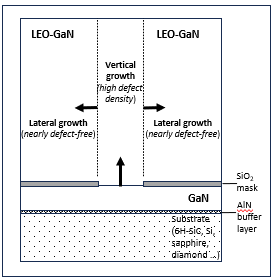
Fig.1 A schematic diagram of the lateral epitaxial overgrowth (LEO) of GaN.The LEO film grows simultaneously from the GaN windows both vertically and at the same time extends laterally over the mask, forming wings of much lower density of structural defects (mostly treading dislocations)

LEO involves growing a seed GaN layer of the material on a substrate, then etching a patterned mask on the surface of the seed layer, commonly silicon dioxide or silicon nitride, leaving some GaN seed windows exposed that act as crystallographic template for the subsequent growth of the GaN layer (Figure 1). The new LEO film grows simultaneously from the GaN windows both vertically and at the same time extends laterally over the mask, forming wings of much lower density of structural defects (mostly treading dislocations). The wings can merge together to form a continuous GaN film, or remain separated by seams. Notably LEO process drastically reduces the defects in the crystal structure of the laterally grown areas by filtering them out at the mask interface. LEO can be performed from the vapor phase, depending on the material and the growth conditions via epitaxial growth techniques such as metalorganic vapour-phase epitaxy (MOCVD) or hydride vapour-phase epitaxy (HVPE).

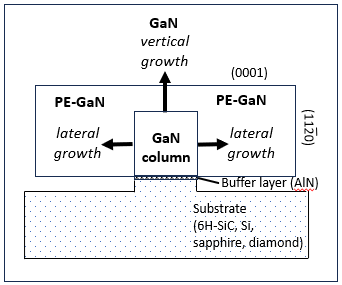
Fig.2 A schematic diagram of the pendeo-epitaxial (PE) growth of GaN.The material grown laterally between the columns doesn’t touch the underlying seed film thus leaving it suspended without contact with the initial seed layer.

== Pendeo-epitaxy ==
Initially PE was developed as an alternative technology and complementary approach to lateral epitaxial overgrowth (LEO) of GaN on SiC substrate. Pendeo-epitaxy of GaN involves growing a continuous GaN film, commonly with high density of dislocations, as a seed layer on a substrate (SiC, sapphire or Si), then etching away portions from the GaN film (seed layer) thus leaving GaN seed stripes or columns, separated by trenches. The subsequent PE layer grows simultaneously from the tops and the side walls of the GaN stripes or columns (Figure 2). Thus, the top and the side walls of these columns act as homoepitaxial seed layers, which act as crytallographic templates for the subsequent vertical and lateral growth of continuous PE GaN layers. The regions of lateral growth are again with two to four orders of magnitude lower density of dislocations. Importantly, the film grows laterally from the side walls of the columns and extends horizontally over the trenches without touching the initial seed layer, forming wings of low crystallographic defect density. Hence pendeo-epitaxy, a term from Latin pendare, meaning to hang down, suspend. The wings can merge to form a continuous film or remain separated by seams. As with LEO, pendeo-epitaxy mechanism reduces the crystallographic defects in the film by avoiding the direct contact with the substrate, eliminating the lattice mismatch and the thermal mismatch stress/strain. Pendeo-epitaxy is mainly performed from the vapor phase via MOCVD and HVPE, and initially is used for growing gallium nitride (GaN) microelectronic device structures.

In the case of GaN material system, LEO and PE technology was initiated in the late nineties and early 2000s in Prof. R.F. Davis group at NCSU. The PE and LEO technologies are not limited to the development of low defect density wide bandgap GaN layers, important for the microelectronics industry, but also for many other epitaxial materials systems (Si, SiC, diamond etc.). Modeling of the LEO and PE growth processes reveals improved stress/strain characteristics and the concomitant improved characteristics in the microelectronic devices fabricated thereby. The strong microelectronics relevance of PE and LEO technologies to enable low density of dislocations in the semiconductor layers was documented in numerous patents.
