= Ravindranath Droopad =

American electrical engineer

Ravindranath Droopad is an electrical engineer at Texas State University in San Marcos, Texas. He was named a Fellow of the Institute of Electrical and Electronics Engineers (IEEE) in 2016 for his contributions to epitaxial growth of advanced materials for RF and CMOS applications.
