= Odette Bergoffen =

French resistance fighter (1924–2026)

- Bergoffen in c. 1945
- Born: Odette Marie-Louise Blanchet; 19 October 1924; Vernoil, France
- Died: 6 January 2026 (aged 101)
- Occupation: Resistance fighter

Odette Marie-Louise Bergoffen (French: [ɔdɛt maʁilwiz bɛʁgɔfɛn]; née Blanchet; 19 October 1924 – 6 January 2026) was a French resistance fighter.

== Biography ==
Born in Vernoil on 19 October 1924, Bergoffen was the daughter of Eugène and Marie-Louise Blanchet. She worked on a farm in her youth and met the Moscovicis, a Jewish family who became close to her own family. During the German occupation, she anticipated the impending deportation of her Jewish friends. On 12 September 1942, she picked up Louise Moscovici and traveled by bicycle to a nearby train station, and reached Tours. She had originally planned to leave Moscovici with her aunt, but the aunt had already been deported. Bergoffen then contacted Jean Meunier, one of the leaders of the French Resistance, who provided Moscovici with papers to cross into the Zone libre and from there reached a home run by the Union générale des israélites de France. However, the home was known to Nazi authorities and therefore unsafe, so Bergoffen rescued all the children inside the home in January 1943, remaining in hiding in Tours and Morannes until liberation in March 1945.

In addition to her rescue efforts, Bergoffen was an agent of Libération-Nord in the Tours sector, operating under the code name "Michèle". She held the rank of sergeant as evidenced by a letter addressed to her by Charles de Gaulle on 1 September 1945. On 26 February 1946, she married Léo Bergoffen, who had survived Auschwitz, and the couple moved to Avrillé, where they had two children: Françoise and Jacques. In 1994, she was named Righteous Among the Nations by Yad Vashem for her work to save Jewish children from Nazi authorities. On 31 December 2006, she was named a knight of the Legion of Honour. On 15 January 2025, she was promoted to Grand Officer.

Bergoffen died on 6 January 2026, at the age of 101.
