= Navid Pourfaraj =

Iranian actor (born 1988)

- نوید پورفرج
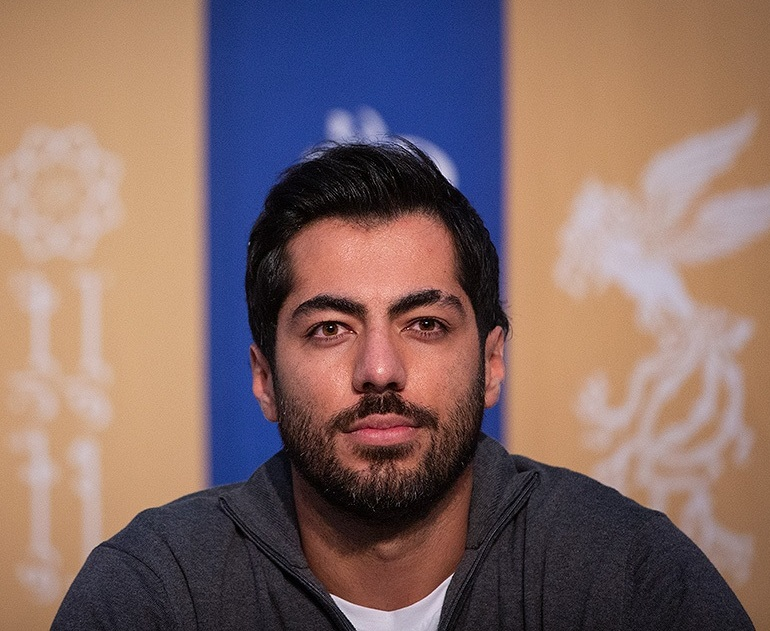
- Pourfaraj at the 2020 Fajr Film Festival
- Born: April 22, 1988 (age 38); Arak, Markazi, Iran
- Occupation: Actor
- Years active: 2012–present

Navid Pourfaraj (Persian: نوید پورفرج; born April 22, 1988) is an Iranian actor. He is best known for his role as Amir in Sheeple (2018) for which he earned a Crystal Simorgh, a Hafez Award, an Iran Cinema Celebration Award and an Iran's Film Critics and Writers Association Award nominations. He won the Best Actor Award at the 8th Duhok International Film Festival for his performance in Zalava (2021).

== Filmography ==
=== Film ===
Year	Title	Role	Director	Notes
2018	Sheeple	Amir Harekat	Houman Seyyedi	
2020	Bone Marrow	Amir Bodaghi	Hamid Ghorbani	
2021	Zalava	Masoud Ahmadi	Arsalan Amiri	
2023	Rainstorm	Bahman	Touraj Aslani	
2024	Bodiless	Mohsen Shokouhi	Morteza Alizadeh	
2025	Highway Deer	Abes	Abolfazl Saffary	
2025	A Time in Eternity	Vahid	Mehdi Norouzian	
2026	Idol	Shahrokh	Hamid Nematollah	

=== Web ===
Year	Title	Role	Director	Platform	Notes
2021	Mutual Friendship	Himself	Shahab Hosseini	Namava	Talk show; 1 episode
2025–2026	Drunkard Morning	Rahim Najjar	Narges Abyar	Sheyda	Main role
2025	The Savage	Forouhar	Houman Seyyedi	Filmnet	Guest appearance; 1 episode

=== Television ===
Year	Title	Role	Director	Network	Notes
2012	The Wall	Abbasi	Sirous Moghaddam	IRIB TV1	TV series; recurring role
2013	Maternal	Maryam's brother	Javad Afshar	IRIB TV3	TV series; recurring role

== Theatre ==
Year	Title	Playwright	Director	Stage
2023	Mad's Girl Love Song	Tala Mo'tazedi	Arvand Dashtaray, Marene Van Holk	City Theater of Tehran

== Awards and nominations ==
Award	Year	Category	Nominated Work	Result	Ref.
Duhok International Film Festival	2021	Best Actor of a Kurdish Feature Film	Zalava	Won	
Fajr Film Festival	2018	Best Actor in a Supporting Role	Sheeple	Nominated	
Fajr Film Festival	2020	Best Actor in a Supporting Role	Bone Marrow	Nominated	
Fajr Film Festival	2021	Best Actor in a Leading Role	Zalava	Nominated	
Fajr Film Festival	2025	Best Actor in a Leading Role	Highway Deer	Honorary Diploma	
Hafez Awards	2019	Best Actor – Motion Picture	Sheeple	Nominated	
Hafez Awards	2024	Best Actor – Motion Picture	Bodiless	Nominated	
Hafez Awards	2025	Best Actor – Motion Picture	Highway Deer	Nominated	
Iran Cinema Celebration	2019	Best Actor in a Supporting Role	Sheeple	Nominated	
Iran's Film Critics and Writers Association	2018	Best Actor in a Supporting Role	Sheeple	Nominated	
