= Leos =

Leos may refer to:

== People ==
- Aiden Leos, crime victim
- Leos Carax, French film director, critic, and writer
- Leos Moskos (1620–1690), painter and educator
- Leoš Firkušný, Czech musicologist
- Leoš Friedl (born 1977), Czech tennis player
- Leoš Heger (born 1948), Czech doctor, university lecturer and politician
- Leoš Hlaváček (born 1963), Czech sport shooter
- Leoš Janáček, Czech composer, musical theorist and folklorist
- Leoš Kalvoda (born 1958), Czech football manager and player
- Leoš Mareš (born 1976), Czech television and radio presenter and singer
- Leoš Petrovský (born 1993), Czech handball player
- Leoš Pípa (born 1971), Czech ice hockey player
- Leoš Svárovský (born 1961), Czech flautist and conductor
- Leoš Čermák (born 1978), Czech ice hockey player
- Leoš Šimánek (1946–2026), Czech traveler
- Leoš Škoda (born 1953), Czech ski jumper

== Other ==
- Leos (mythology), name of two figures in Greek mythology

== See also ==
- Leo (disambiguation)
