= Bodiless =

2024 film

Bi Badan
- Directed by: Morteza Alizadeh
- Written by: Kazem Daneshi
- Produced by: Seyyed Mostafa Ahmadi
- Starring: Elnaz Shakerdoost; Navid Pourfaraj; Soroush Sehhat; Pejman Jamshidi
- Release date: 1 February 2024
- Running time: 90 minutes
- Country: Iran
- Language: Persian

Bodiless (Persian: بی بدن, romanized: Bi Badan) is a 2024 film by the Iranian director Morteza Alizadeh. Elnaz Shakerdoost, Soroush Sehhat and Navid Pourfaraj starred in the principal roles.

This film was nominated for the best first director and the best first film at the Fajr Film Festival.

== Plot ==
The story of the film is a loose adaptation of several real court cases.

== Cast ==
- Elnaz Shakerdoost as Ms.Moghdam: Arghavan’s mother
- Soroush Sehhat as Behroz Moghadam: Arghavan‘s father
- Navid Pourfaraj as Mohsen Shokohi: the interrogator of Arghavan’s case
- Pejman Jamshidi as Mehrdad Behmanesh: Soroush’s father and Shohereh’s ex-husband and Mona’s husband
- Gellareh Abbassi as Shohreh: Soroush’s mother and Mehrdad’s ex-wife
- Mina Vahid as Mona: Soroush’s step-mother and Mehrdad’s wife

== Reception ==
Behrouz Afkhami called this film a revival of a successful genre in cinema and emphasized that this movie can compete with comedy movies in terms of audience attraction and sales.

Film critic "Mohammad Taghi Fahim" believes that this film has a new position that has not been seen in the cinema in recent years. This film nominated for the best first director and the best first film at the Fajr Film Festival.
