= Lio =

Lio or LIO may refer to:

== People ==
- Lio people, an ethnic group in Indonesia
- Lio (singer) (born 1962), Portuguese-Belgian singer and actress
- Leonel Cunha Guerra (born 1987), Portuguese football player known as Lio
- Lee Hyung-sang, nickname Lio (1985), South Korean football player
- L.I.O. Petrodollars, member of French rap band Sexion d'Assaut
- Augie Lio (1918–1989), American football player
- Lio Rush (born 1994), American professional wrestler
- Lionel Messi (born 1987), Argentine football player

== Places ==
- Lio Lesong, Upper Baram, Sarawak, Malaysia
- Lio Matoh or Lio Matu, Marudi, Sarawak, Malaysia
- Palau del Marquès de Lió (Llió in Spanish), civic building in Barcelona, Spain
- San Lio, Venice, Italy, church

== Books and comics ==
- Liō, comic by Mark Tatulli
- Lio Junior, anime character

== Abbreviations ==
- Left inferior oblique eye muscle in ophthalmology
- Lesser included offense, in criminal law
- Liberal international order, rules-based agreements between states
- Limón International Airport, IATA code
- LIO Target, the open-source SCSI target included in Linux
- Lithium oxide (Li_{2}O), chemical compound

== Other uses ==
- Lio language of Indonesia
- Ngadha–Lio languages, also known as the Central Flores languages
- Lio 'On Famör Rotuma Party, or LFR (meaning "Voice of the Rotuman People"), Fiji
- Ford Lio Ho Co. (Lio Ho, 六和 six peace) Taiwanese-based automaker
- Lio (album), by singer Lio
- liO, the brand used by public transport services offered by the French region of Occitanie, including TER Occitanie

== See also ==
- Lios (disambiguation)
- Leo (disambiguation)
