= Leo Hilokoski =

Finnish bowler (1941–2026)

Personal information
- Nationality: Finnish
- Born: 1941
- Died: February 2026 (aged 84–85)

Sport
- Sport: Bowling

Leo Hilokoski (1941 – February 2026) was a Finnish bowler. Hilokoski was the world champion in team bowling in 1975 and European champion in 1973. He won the personal Finnish Championship in 1978. Hilokoski also played golf. He made three holes-in-one.

== Biography ==
Hilokoski was born in Helsinki in 1941. He participated in the Ballmaster Open tournament from the beginning in 1971, although he missed a few. He won the tournament in 1977. He had three perfect games in ten-pin bowling.

He lived the winters in Málaga, where he arranged golf tours. His sister Lea Hilokoski (died 2007) was also a bowler and was among the best women bowlers.

Hilokoski died in February 2026, at the age of 84.

== Achievements ==
- World champion in team bowling 1975
- European champion in team bowling 1973
- Personal Finnish championship 1978
- Bowler of the decade 1970s
