= Lios =

Lios may refer to several places in Ireland:

- Lios Ceannúir, or anglicized Liscannor, a coastal village in County Clare, Ireland
- Lios an Gharráin, or anglicised Lissagurraun, a townland of Moycullen in County Galway, Ireland
- Lios Póil, or anglicized Lispole, a Gaeltacht village in County Kerry, Ireland

== See also ==
- Lio (disambiguation)
