= Zalava =

- Film poster
- Directed by: Arsalan Amiri
- Written by: Arsalan Amiri; Ida Panahandeh; Tahmineh Bahramalian
- Produced by: Rouhollah Baradari; Samira Baradari
- Starring: Navid Pourfaraj; Pouria Rahimi Sam; Hoda Zeinolabedin
- Cinematography: Mohammad Rasouli
- Edited by: Emad Khodabakhsh
- Music by: Ramin Kousha
- Production companies: Touba Films; Farabi Cinema Foundation; Evar Film Studio; KOFIC; Göteborg Film Fund; Hong Kong Asia Film Financing Forum; Kingyo Films
- Distributed by: LevelK; Khaneh Film
- Release dates: February 1, 2021 (FIFF); June 29, 2022 (Iran)
- Running time: 93 minutes
- Country: Iran
- Languages: Persian; Kurdish

Zalava (Persian: زالاوا) is a 2021 Iranian horror drama film directed by Arsalan Amiri and written by Amiri, Ida Panahandeh and Tahmineh Bahramalian. The film screened for the first time at the 39th Fajr Film Festival and earned 6 nominations and received 4 awards.

== Cast ==
- Navid Pourfaraj as Sergeant Masoud Ahmadi
- Pouria Rahimi Sam as Amardan
- Hoda Zeinolabedin as Malihe
- Baset Rezaei as Younes
- Fereydoun Hamedi as Amous
- Shahou Rostami as Khalaj
- Mahsa Hejazi as Khalaj's daughter
- Leila Beigi as Leila
- Zahed Zandi as Sergeant Amini
- Saleh Rahimi as Arhim
- Hadi Ahmadi as Soldier
- Darioush Karim Raouf as Zalava People
- Salar Zarei as Zalava People
- Masoud Beigi as Zalava People
- Kordowan Boustan as Musician
- Varya Amini as Zalava People
- Asad Houshman as Zalava People
- Azin Kananian as Zalava People
- Romina Haji Hosseini as Zalava People
- Narin Malek as Zalava People
- Keyvan Sheikh Ahmadi as Zalava People

== Reception ==
=== Critical response ===
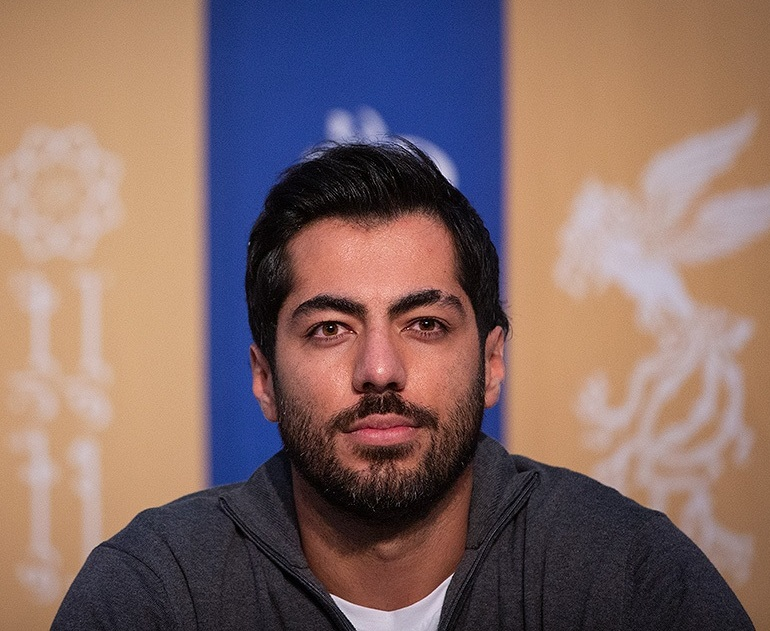
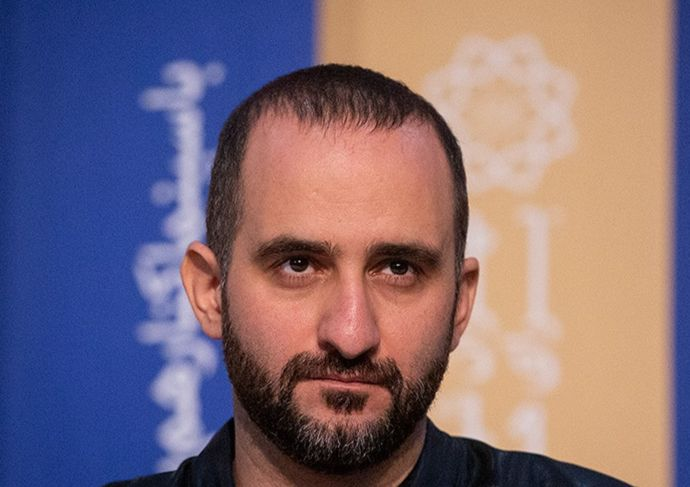
The performances of Navid Pourfaraj and Pouria Rahimi Sam garnered critical acclaim and both received Crystal Simorgh nominations for Best Actor and Best Supporting Actor, respectively, with Rahimi Sam winning.

On Rotten Tomatoes, the film holds an approval rating of 89% based on 17 reviews, with an average rating of 7.2/10.

Marking a confident, cinema-literate feature debut for helmer and co-writer Arsalan Amiri, a member of the Iranian Kurdish minority, the film puts a new spin on genre conventions. But perhaps its biggest asset is the performance of tall, toned and impressively mustached star Navid Pourfaraj as the sergeant of a nearby gendarmerie, whose attempts to lay down the law with the trigger-happy residents of Zalava result in unintended consequences.

— Variety / Alissa Simon

Amiri has made the village of the film with precise mezzanine, costume design, accent form and behavior and has worked properly on these things.

— Haft / Massoud Farasati

=== Accolades ===
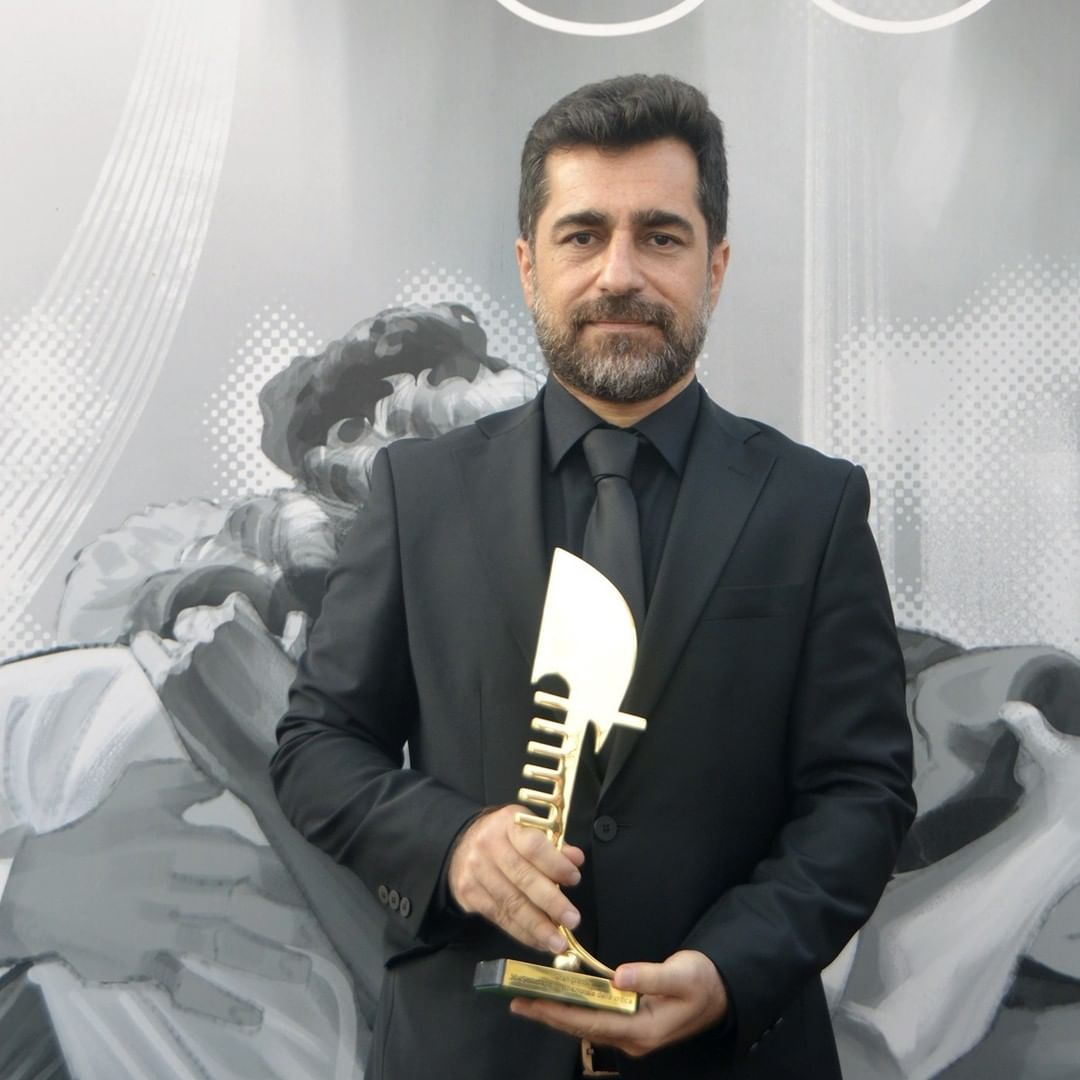
Arsalan Amiri winning the Grand Prize Venice International Critics' Week at the 78th Venice International Film Festival.

Year	Award	Category	Recipient	Result	Ref.
2021	Fajr Film Festival	Best Supporting Actor	Pouria Rahimi Sam	Won	
2021	Fajr Film Festival	Best Cinematography	Mohammad Rasouli	Honorary Diploma	
2021	Fajr Film Festival	Best First Film	Arsalan Amiri	Won	
2021	Fajr Film Festival	Best Screenplay	Arsalan Amiri, Ida Panahandeh and Tahmineh Bahramalian	Won	
2021	Fajr Film Festival	Best Film	Zalava	Nominated	
2021	Fajr Film Festival	Best Director	Arsalan Amiri	Nominated	
2021	Fajr Film Festival	Best Actor	Navid Pourfaraj	Nominated	
2021	Fajr Film Festival	Sound Recording	Rshid Daneshman	Nominated	
2021	Fajr Film Festival	Sound Editing	Amir Hossein Ghasemi	Nominated	
2021	Fajr Film Festival	Costume Design	Mohammad Hossein Karami	Nominated	
2021	Venice International Film Festival	Grand Prize Venice International Critics' Week	Arsalan Amiri	Won	
2021	Venice International Film Festival	FIPRESCI Prize (Parallel Sections)	Arsalan Amiri	Won	
2021	São Paulo International Film Festival	New Directors Competition (Best Film)	Arsalan Amiri	Nominated	
2021	Fantastic Fest	Next Wave (Best Film)	Arsalan Amiri	Won	
2021	Duhok International Film Festival	Best Director of a Kurdish Feature Film	Arsalan Amiri	Won	
2021	Duhok International Film Festival	Best Actor of a Kurdish Feature Film	Navid Pourfaraj	Won	
2022	Iran's Film Critics and Writers Association	Best Actor in a Supporting Role	Pouria Rahimi Sam	Nominated	
2022	Iran's Film Critics and Writers Association	Best Sound	Rashid Daneshmand, Amir Hossein Ghasemi	Won	
2022	Iran's Film Critics and Writers Association	Best Creativity and Talent (first filmmakers)	Arsalan Amiri	Nominated	
