= Léa =

Léa may refer to:

== People with the given name Léa ==
- Princess Léa of Belgium (born Léa Inga Dora Wolman; 1951), the widow of Prince Alexandre of Belgium and aunt of King Philippe of Belgium
- Léa Bouard (born 1996), German freestyle skier
- Léa Casta (born 2006), French snowboarder
- Léa Catania (born 1993), French synchronized swimmer
- Léa Clermont-Dion (born 1991) is a Canadian author, feminist, television and radio host, and body image advocate
- Léa Cousineau, Canadian politician and a City Councillor in Montreal
- Léa Curinier (born 2001), French racing cyclist
- Léa Drucker (born 1972), French actress
- Léa Fazer (born 1965), Swiss film director, screenwriter and actress
- Léa Fehner (born 1981), French film director and screenwriter
- Léa Garcia (born 1933), Brazilian actress
- Léa Jamelot (born 1992), French canoeist
- Léa Labrousse (born 1997), French individual and synchronised trampolinist
- Léa Le Garrec (born 1993), French footballer
- Léa Lemare (born 1996), French ski jumper
- Léa Linster (born 1955), Luxembourg chef
- Léa Palermo (born 1993), French badminton player
- Léa Parment (born 1996), French ice hockey player
- Léa and Christine Papin, two French sisters and live-in maids, convicted of murdering their employer's wife and daughter in Le Mans, France on February 2, 1933.
- Léa Pool (born 1950), Swiss-Canadian filmmaker
- Léa Roback (1903–2000), Canadian trade union organizer, social activist, pacifist, and feminist
- Léa Roussel (born 1992), French acrobatic gymnast
- Léa Salamé (born 1979), Lebanese-born French journalist
- Léa Serna (born 1999), French figure skater
- Léa Seydoux (born 1985), French actress
- Léa Sprunger (born 1990), Swiss track and field athlete
- Léa Stein (born 1936), French artist and accessories make

== People with the middle name Léa ==
- James Léa Siliki (born 1996), French footballer

== People with the surname Léa ==
- Charles Léa (born 1951), Cameroonian footballer
- Eugène N'Jo Léa (1931–2006), Cameroonian footballer

== Other uses ==
- Léa (film), 2011 French erotic drama film directed by Bruno Rolland

== See also ==
- LEA (disambiguation), also covers Lea
- Lea (given name)
- Lea (surname)
- LEAS (disambiguation)
