= Fattaneh Haj Seyed Javadi =

Iranian novelist

- Born: 1945 (age 80–81); Kazerun, Fars, Iran
- Other name: Parvin
- Known for: The Morning After (novel)

Fattaneh Haj Seyed Javadi (Persian: فتانه حاج‌سیدجوادی, also Romanized as “Fattāne(h) Hāj-Seyyed-Javādī”; born 1945) is an Iranian novelist.

Born in Kazerun, Seyed Javadi studied in Tehran and Isfahan, after which she taught for many years. In the early 1990s, she translated Jeffrey Archer's Kane and Abel. Her first novel, The Morning of the Hangover published in German as Der Morgen der Trunkenheit was a bestseller in Iran for four years running and was in its 29th printing in 2002. She went on to write a collection of short stories: In der Abgeschiedenheit des Schlafs (In the Lonesomeness of Sleep).

The Morning After (Persian: بامداد خمار), tells the story of an aristocratic woman who marries a carpenter to defy her family and its publication was a turning point for women writers. Strict rules imposed after the 1979 Revolution funneled expression which was unacceptable in public life into fictional characters. Javadi's The Morning of the Hangover contended that social themes could be explored even within the bounds of censorship.

The English edition of the book is published under the title of The Morning After by Firouz Media in 2022.

== Selected works ==
- Persian: بامداد خمار, 1995 in Persian
  - Der Morgen der Trunkenheit, 2000 in German
  - The Morning After, 2022 In English
- Persian: در خلوت خواب (2001) (in Persian)
- In der Abgeschiedenheit des Schlafs: Erzählungen (2004) (in German)
