= Léo Fioravanti =

Brazilian footballer

Personal information
- Full name: Leonardo Savicius Raimundo Fioravanti
- Date of birth: 26 November 1992 (age 33)
- Place of birth: São Paulo, Brazil
- Height: 1.93 m (6 ft 4 in)
- Position: Centre-back

Senior career*
Years	Team	Apps	(Gls)
2013–2015	CA Juventus	36	(4)
2015	Bragantino	1	(0)
2016	Monte Azul	6	(1)
2016	PSTC	4	(1)
2016	Chiasso	1	(0)
2017	Rio Branco	2	(0)
2017–2018	URT	3	(1)
2018	São Bernardo	4	(0)
2019	Treze	9	(0)
2019	Portuguesa	4	(0)
2020	São Bernardo	4	(0)
2020	Tsarsko Selo	6	(0)
- * Club domestic league appearances and goals as of 15 July 2020

Leonardo Savicius Raimundo Fioravanti (born 26 November 1992), known as Léo Fioravanti, is a Brazilian professional footballer who plays as a centre back.
