= Leoš Pípa =

Czech ice hockey right winger

- Born: September 30, 1971 (age 54) Jihlava, Czechoslovakia
- Height: 6 ft 2 in (188 cm)
- Weight: 201 lb (91 kg; 14 st 5 lb)
- Position: Right wing
- Shot: Left
- Played for: HC Dukla Jihlava; Chamonix HC; GKS Tychy; Esbjerg; HK Riga 2000; Herning Blue Fox; Pingouins de Morzine-Avoriaz; HSC Csíkszereda
- Playing career: 1990–2008

Leoš Pípa (born September 30, 1971) is a Czech former professional ice hockey right winger

Pípa played in the Czechoslovak First Ice Hockey League and the Czech Extraliga for HC Dukla Jihlava from 1990 to 2000. He played 281 games for the team in total and won a league championship in 1991. He also won the Danish League championship with Esbjerg in 2004 and the Latvian League championship with HK Riga 2000 in 2004.
