= Leo the Lion =

Leo the Lion may refer to:

== Film and television ==
- Leo the Lion (MGM), the mascot of the Hollywood film studio Metro-Goldwyn-Mayer
- Leo the Lion (2005 film), an Italian animated film
- Leo the Lion: King of the Jungle, a 1994 Japanese animated film from Jetlag Productions
- Leo the Lion (TV series), a 1966–1967 Japanese animated series by Osamu Tezuka

== Other uses ==
- Leo the Lion (singer), Leo Ihenacho (born 1977), British singer
- Leo "The Lion" Nomellini (1924–2000), American football player and professional wrestler
- Leo the Lion, the mascot of Real Salt Lake soccer team
