= Leo (surname) =

The surname Leo may refer to:

- Aleksandra Leo (born 1981), Polish politician and lawyer
- Angelo Leo (born 1994), American boxer
- Daniel Leo (mobster) (born 1928), American organized crime figure
- Daniel Leo (rugby union) (born 1982), Samoan rugby player
- Edoardo Leo (born 1972), Italian actor, director and screenwriter
- Efraim Leo (born 1997), Swedish singer and songwriter
- Frank Leo (born 1971), Canadian Catholic cardinal
- Friedrich Leo (1851–1914), German classical philologist
- Henning Leo (1885–1953), Swedish politician
- Jim Leo (born 1937), American football player
- Juliusz Leo (1861–1918), Polish politician
- Leo KoGuan (born 1955), Chinese American businessman
- Leonard Leo (born 1965), American lawyer
- Leonardo Leo (1694–1744), Neapolitan composer
- Matt Leo (born 1992), Australian-American football player
- Melissa Leo (born 1960), American actress
- Paul Leo (1893–1958), German Lutheran pastor and theologian
- Ted Leo (born 1970), American musician
- Titus Leo (born 1999), American football player

== See also ==
- Leo (given name)
- Leos (disambiguation)
