= Hossein Kiani =

Iranian playwright and theatre director

- حسین کیانی
- Education: College of Fine Arts University (B.A. in directing); Tarbiat Modares University (M.A. in directing)
- Occupations: Playwright, theatre director, researcher and educator
- Spouse: Roya Mirelmi (m. 2008)
- Children: Karen Kiani
- Writing career
- Language: Persian
- Years active: 1996–present
- Subjects: Iranian history, traditions and social issues
- Notable works: Bidari-ye Khaneh-ye Nesvan (The Awakening of the Women's House); Hamsaye-ye Agha (Mr. Neighbor); Penhan-khaneh-ye Panj-dar (The Hidden House of Five Doors); Vaqe'e dar Majles-e Sudabeh-khani (The Incident at the Assembly of Sudabeh Recitation)

Hossein Kiani (Persian: حسین کیانی, born January 22, 1975) is an Iranian playwright and theatre director. His works often explore Iranian history and society, using historical narratives to examine contemporary social and political issues.

== Early life and education ==
Kiani was born in Malayer, Hamadan province, Iran. He studied directing at the College of Fine Arts of the University of Tehran, where he completed his undergraduate studies. He later received a master's degree in directing from the Faculty of Arts at Tarbiat Modares University.
