= Island growth =

Island growth is a physical model of deposited film growth and chemical vapor deposition.

== Introduction ==
When atoms are deposited slowly onto a flat surface, the first one undergoes a random walk on that surface. Eventually a second atom is deposited; in all likelihood it will eventually meet the first atom. Once the two atoms meet they may bond to form a particle with a higher mass and a lower random walk velocity. Because the bonded particles are now more stable and less mobile than before, they are called an "island." Subsequent atoms deposited on the substrate eventually meet and bond with the island, further increasing its size and stability. Eventually the island can grow to fill the entire substrate with a single large grain.

The faster the atoms are deposited, the greater amount of atoms on the substrate before any large stable islands form. As these atoms meet, they will bond to their local neighbors before having the chance to migrate to a distant island. In this way a large number of separate islands are formed and can grow independently. Eventually the separate islands will grow to become separate grains in the final film.

The island growth model is used to explain how fast deposition techniques (such as sputter deposition) can produce films with many randomly oriented grains, whereas slow deposition techniques (such as MBE) tend to produce larger grains with more uniform structure.

== See also ==
- Stranski–Krastanov growth
