= Léo Carioca =

Brazilian footballer

Personal information
- Full name: Leonardo da Silva Costa
- Date of birth: March 9, 1985 (age 41)
- Place of birth: São Paulo, Brazil
- Position: Forward

Youth career
- Comercial

Senior career*
Years	Team	Apps	(Gls)
2002	Cruzeiro		
2003	→ Club Sol de América (loan)		
2003	→ Joinville (loan)		
2004–2005	Botofogo Estacio Desa		
2005–2006	FC Winterthur		
2006	Artsul		
2007	Quissamã		
2008	Castelo Branco		
2009–2011	Vilhena		
2011	Juventud Independiente		
2012	Democrata-GV		
- * Club domestic league appearances and goals

Leonardo da Silva Costa (born March 9, 1985, in Brazil), also known as Léo Carioca, is a Brazilian footballer.

Léo Carioca played for Democrata in the 2012 Campeonato Mineiro. He had previous spells in Switzerland with FC Winterthur and the Brazil national under-20 football team.
