= Emperor Leo =

Emperor Leo may refer to:

- Leo I (emperor) (401–474), Byzantine emperor and Eastern Orthodox saint
- Leo II (emperor) (467–474), Byzantine emperor
- Leontius (?-706), Byzantine emperor under the regnal name of Leo
- Leo III the Isaurian (c. 685–741), Byzantine emperor
- Leo IV the Khazar (750–780), Byzantine emperor
- Leo V the Armenian (775–820), Byzantine emperor
- Leo VI the Wise (866–912), Byzantine emperor
