= Jameh Mosque of Qazvin =

Shi'ite mosque in Qazvin, Iran

Jāmeh Mosque of Qazvin
- مسجد جامع عتيق قزوین
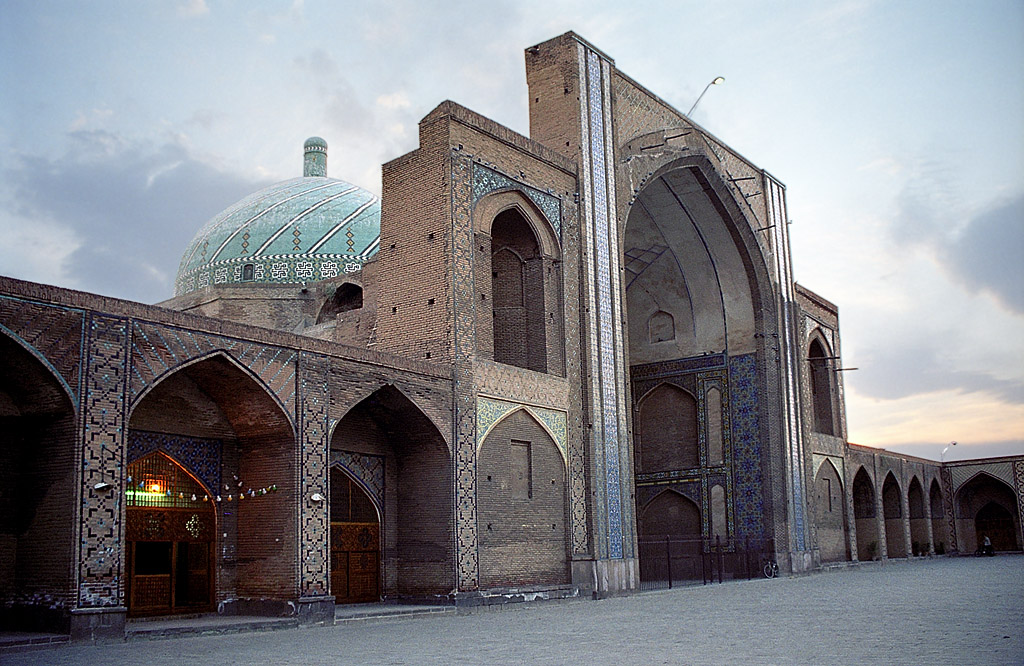

- Location of the mosque in Iran

Religion
- Affiliation: Shia Islam
- Ecclesiastical or organisational status: Friday mosque
- Status: Active

Location
- Location: Qazvin, Qazvin province
- Country: Iran
- Coordinates: 36°15′39″N 50°00′06″E

Architecture
- Type: Mosque architecture
- Style: Abbasid; Safavid; Seljuk
- Completed: 807 CE
- Dome: One (maybe more)

Iran National Heritage List
- Official name: Friday Mosque of Qazvin
- Type: Friday Mosque
- Designated: 1932
- Reference no.: 121
- Conservation organization: Cultural Heritage, Handicrafts and Tourism Organization of Iran

The Jāmeh Mosque of Qazvin (Persian: مسجد جامع عتيق قزوین, romanized: Masjid-e-Jameh Atiq Qazvin; Arabic: جامع قزوين) is a Shi'ite Friday mosque (jāmeh), located in Qazvin, in the Qazvin province of Iran.

Completed in 807 CE, it is one of the oldest mosques in Iran, and was added to the Iran National Heritage List on 6 January 1932, administered by the Cultural Heritage, Handicrafts and Tourism Organization of Iran.

== Architecture ==
The oldest part of the mosque is said to have been constructed by the orders of Harun al-Rashid in 807 CE. Later additions were made, the last being during the late Safavid era. The double-layered main dome of the mosque is from the Seljuk era, and is locked to the public. It houses some examples of relief calligraphy from medieval times. Renovations have also been carried out on many sections of the mosque.

The foundation of the mosque is laid on a Zoroastrian fire temple. In spite of the devastating Mongol invasion, the mosque still stands today. Parts of the mosque have been turned into a public library. The mosque also contains a Shabestan and Ab anbar, both now under the protection of Iran's Cultural Heritage Organization.

Part of the complex caught fire on 28 January 2013. Half of the complex was burnt and destroyed by the fire.

== Gallery ==
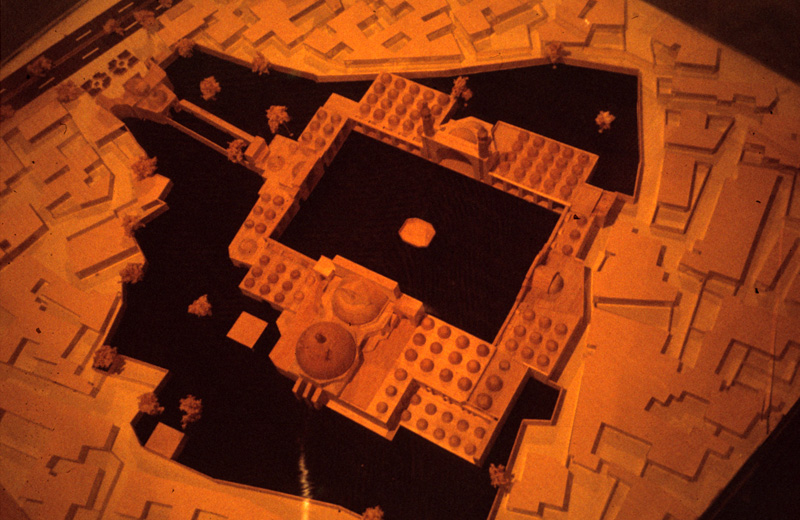

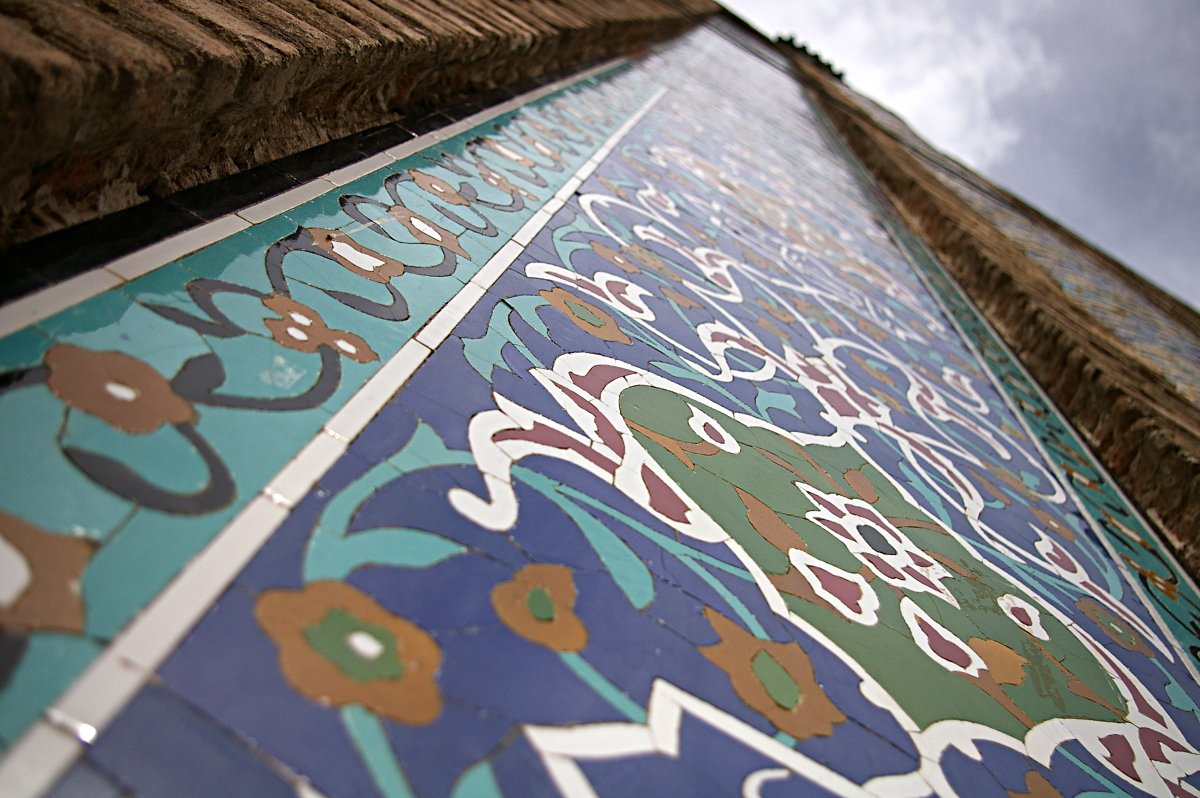

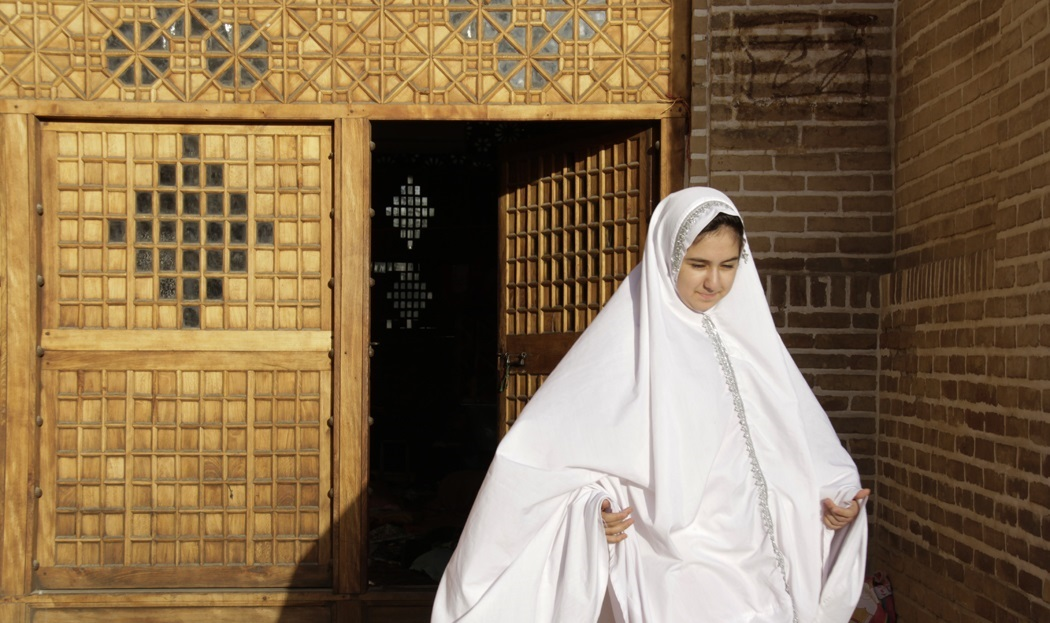

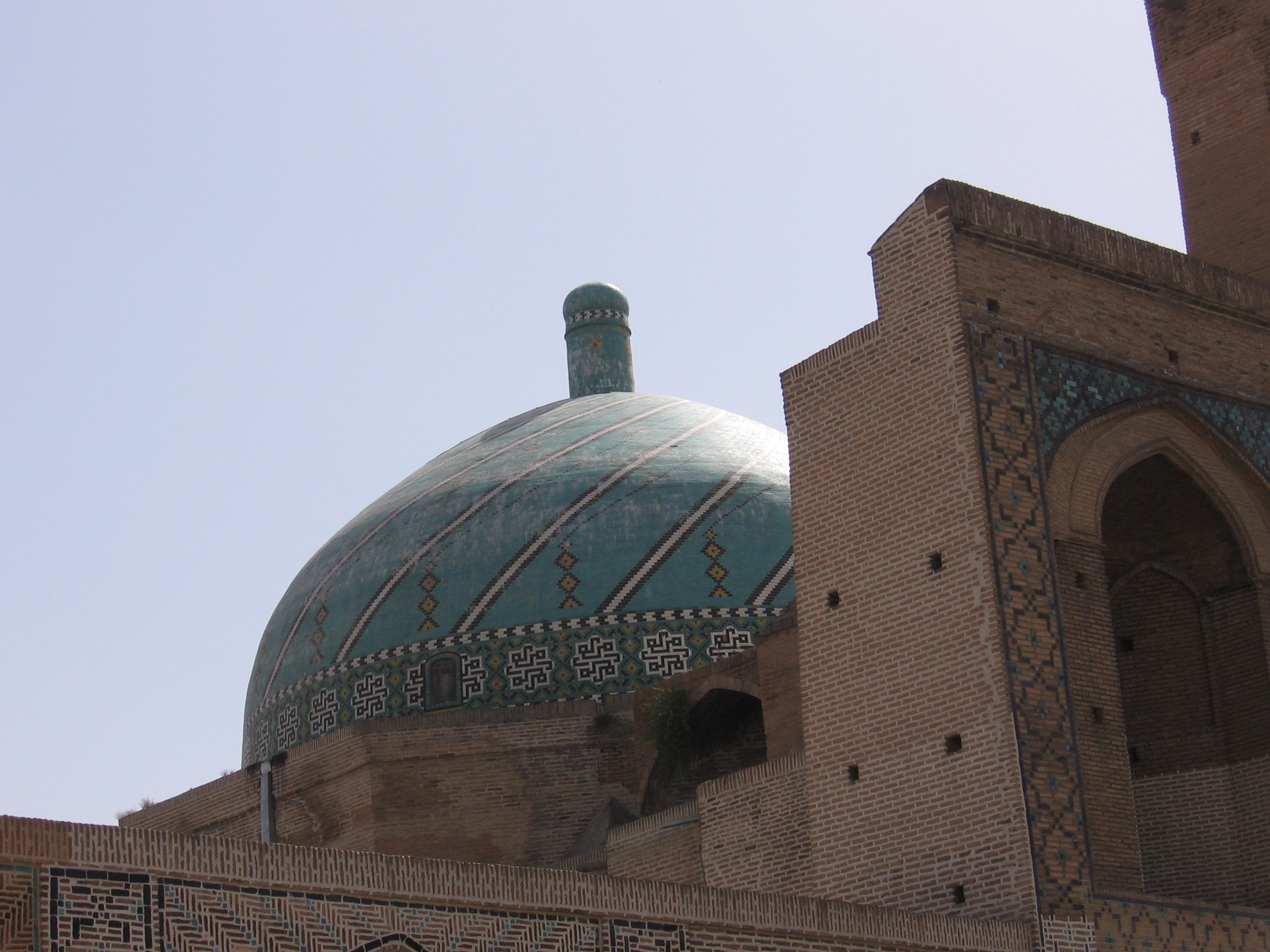

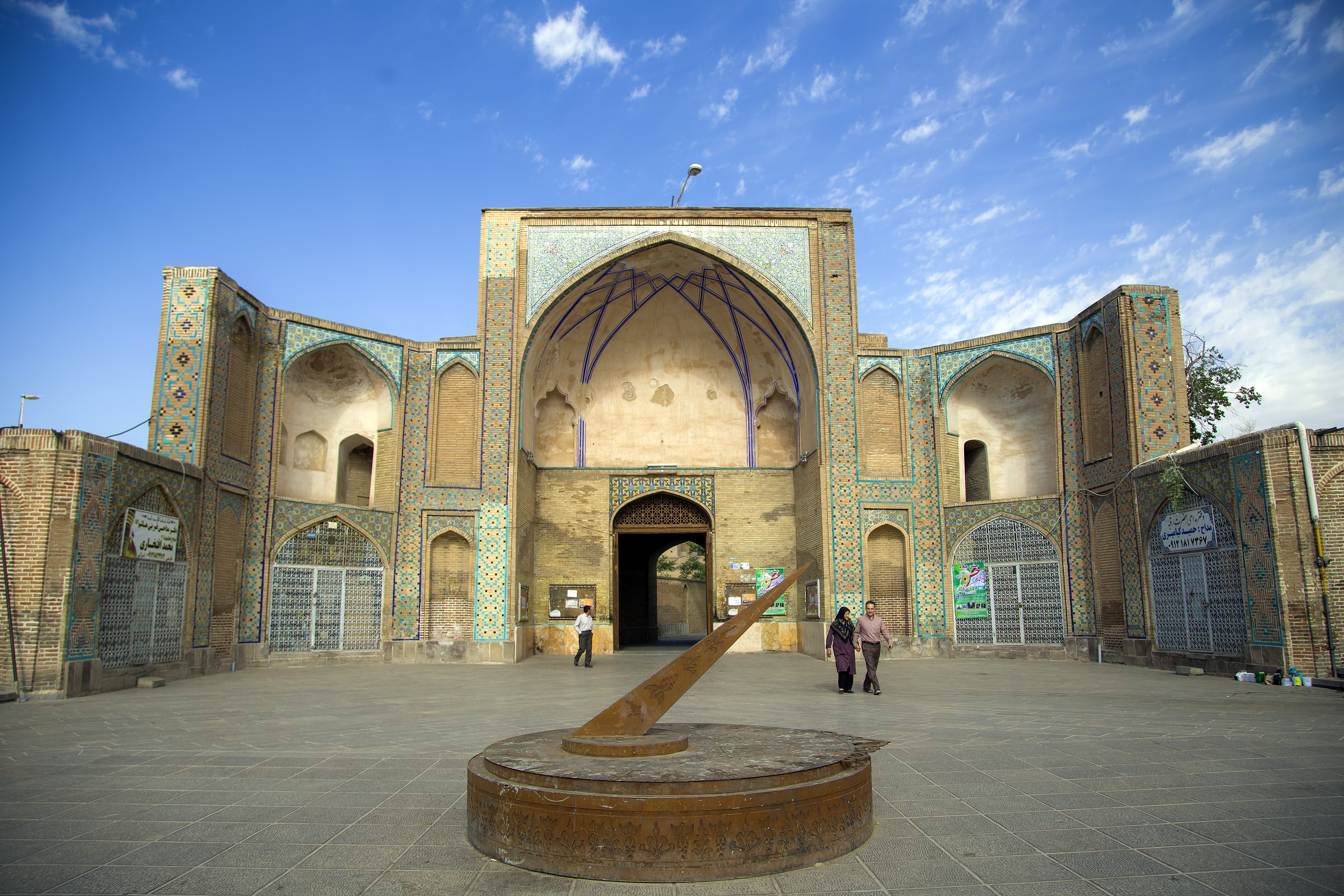

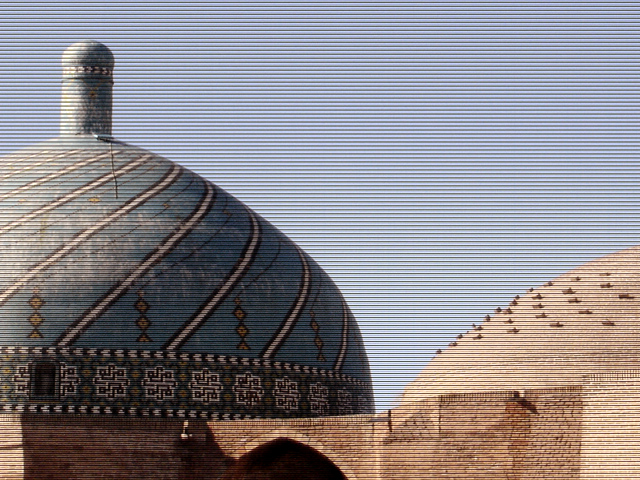

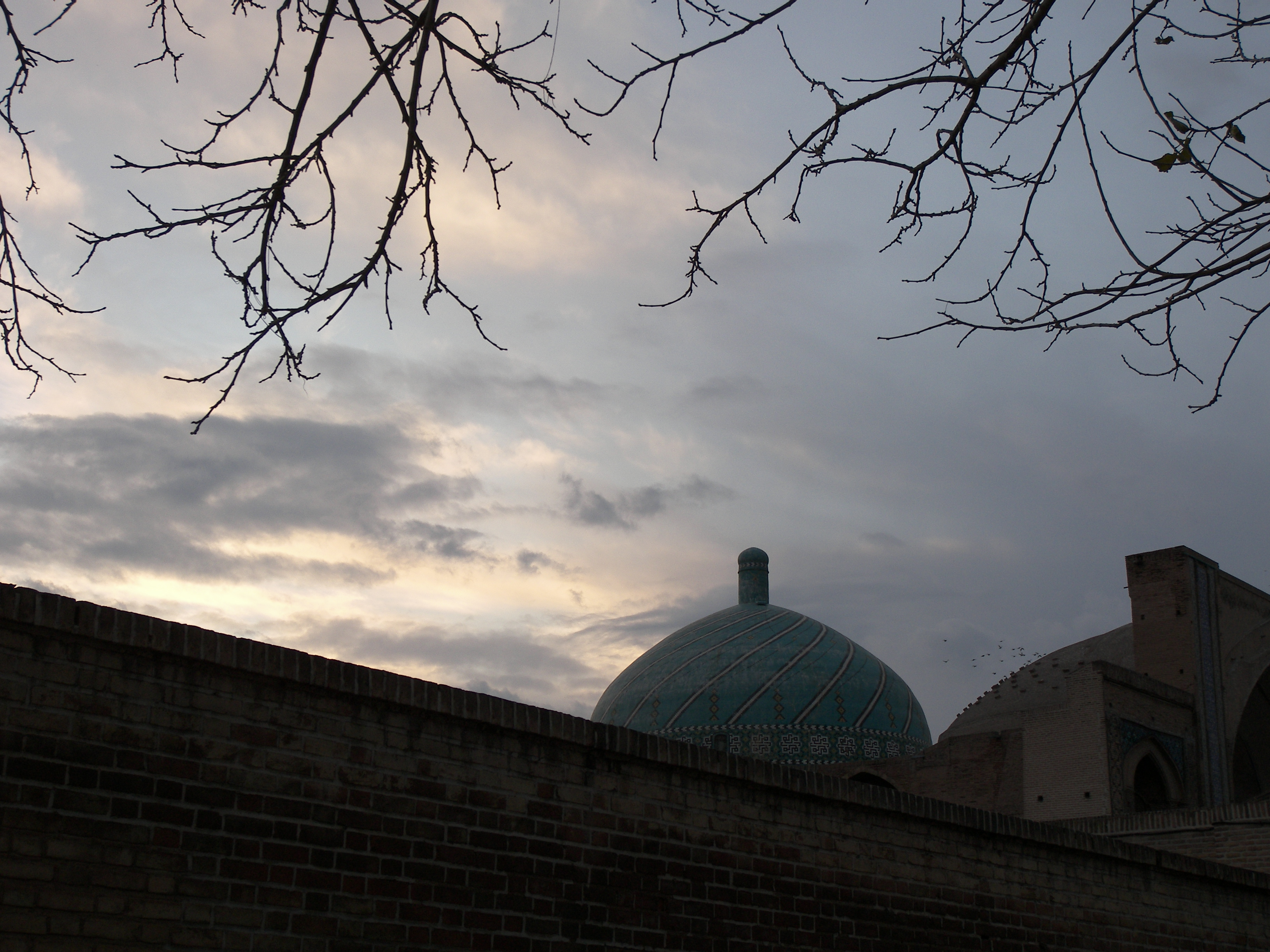

== See also ==
- Shia Islam in Iran
- List of mosques in Iran
- Persian domes
