= Léa Stein =

French artist and accessories maker (born 1936)

An example of Lea Stein's Art Deco jewellery. This poised cat brooch is called "Quarrelsome."

Léa Stein (born 11 February 1936) is a French artist and accessories maker, known for her compressed plastic buttons, brooches and bracelets. She is often hailed as "the most notable and innovative designer of plastic jewelry of the 20th century".

Little is known about her childhood, but some sources suggest that she spent part of it in a WWII concentration camp. She also trained as an artist at a young age.

Stein entered the fashion industry in 1957 working in textiles, and by 1965 had developed an interest in plastic. She worked with her husband, chemist Fernand Steinberger, to develop a process of layering very thin sheets of cellulose acetate (or rhodoid) and laminating them to form a "multi-coloured sandwich of plastic". Each 'sandwich' was baked for a long time, then cooled and cut into shapes. The process could take as long as six months.

This technique allowed Stein to insert different fabrics (such as brocades and lace), colors and textures into the plastic.

== Jewellery ==
The back of a Lea Stein "Quarrelsome" brooch. Note the inscribed v-shaped metal clasp.

Stein's brooches feature animals, cars, household items, celebrities and people in a distinctive style, sometimes resembling Art Deco (which leads some people to mistakenly date her work to the 1920s). Each brooch has a name, sometimes as simple as 'Fox' or more descriptive like 'Quarrelsome' the cat. Each design might come in dozens of different colors and patterns.

The brooches were made in two periods: vintage (1969 to 1981) and modern (1991 —). Each brooch has a distinctive v-shaped metal clasp inscribed with 'Lea Stein Paris'. Some collectors suggest that the clasp determines which era it was made in. Vintage brooches had the clasps heat mounted into the plastic; in modern brooches, the clasps are riveted on. Some early brooches had v-shaped clasps without the 'Lea Stein' inscription. However, other collectors suggest this is not true. The only way to discern vintage from modern is to have an extensive knowledge of Stein's designs.

The most valuable items in Stein's collection are the serigraphy pins and buckles, a plastic / celluloid version of Victorian miniatures.
