= Mohammad Davoudi =

Mohammad Davoudi may refer to:

- Mohammad Davoudi (screenwriter) (born 1989) Iranian screenwriter and director
- Mohammad Davoudi (cinematographer) (born 1959), Iranian cinematographer winner for Best Cinematography at the 16th Fajr International Film Festival
