= Mehdi Norowzian =

Iranian-British director

Mehdi Norowzian (Persian: مهدی نوروزیان) is an Iranian-British director. He was nominated for an Oscar for his short film Killing Joe (1999) at the 72nd Academy Awards.

== Early life ==
He was born in Iran in 1958, and later moved to the UK.

== Career ==
He has directed two films: Leo (2002) starring Joseph Fiennes and Elisabeth Shue, and Killing Joe (1999) short, which starred Daniel Bliss. In 1997, Norowzian unsuccessfully pursued a lawsuit against Guinness for copyright infringement, citing similarities between their 1994 Anticipation advertising campaign and Joy, a short film present on Norowzian's show reel which he distributed to a number of advertising agencies in 1992.

== Filmography ==
=== Feature films ===
| Year | Title | Ref. |
|---|---|---|
| 2002 | Leo | |
| 2026 | A Time in Eternity | |

=== Short films ===
| Year | Title | Ref. |
|---|---|---|
| 1999 | Killing Joe | |
