= Léo Bergoffen =

French Holocaust survivor (1922–2020)

- Born: 30 October 1922; Berlin, Weimar Republic
- Died: 5 July 2020 (aged 97); Angers, France
- Occupation: Translator

Léo Bergoffen (30 October 1922 – 5 July 2020) was a German Jew who emigrated to France in 1938. Deported to Auschwitz, he married former French Resistance fighter and Righteous Among the Nations member Odette Blanchet.

== Biography ==
Bergoffen was born on 30 October 1922 in Berlin. He was the son of Jakob and Felli (née Singer) and had an older brother named Max, born in 1921. The family left Germany for Prague before settling in Angers, France in 1938. Bergoffen became a translator with the Chamber of Commerce, but was subsequently fired because he was Jewish.

In June 1942, Bergoffen went to the zone libre, but was arrested by the Gendarmerie de France in August. He was deported from the Drancy internment camp to Auschwitz in the 27th convoy on 2 September 1942. His parents were both murdered at Auschwitz, but Léo survived.

Bergoffen married former resistant Odette Blanchet on 26 February 1946, with whom he settled in Avrillé in 1962. The couple had one son, Jacques, and Odette was named to the Righteous Among the Nations in 1994. Bergoffen was named as a Knight of the Legion of Honour in 2008.

Léo Bergoffen died in Angers on 5 July 2020 at the age of 97.
