= Hydride vapour-phase epitaxy =

Hydride vapour-phase epitaxy (HVPE) is an epitaxial growth technique often employed to produce semiconductors such as GaN, GaAs, InP and their related compounds, in which hydrogen chloride is reacted at elevated temperature with the group-III metals to produce gaseous metal chlorides, which then react with ammonia to produce the group-III nitrides. Carrier gases commonly used include ammonia, hydrogen and various chlorides.

HVPE technology can significantly reduce the cost of production compared to the most common method of vapor deposition of organometallic compounds (MOCVD). Cost reduction is achieved by significantly reducing the consumption of NH_{3}, cheaper source materials than in MOCVD, reducing the capital equipment costs, due to the high growth rate.

Developed in the 1960s, it was the first epitaxial method used for the fabrication of single GaN crystals.

Hydride vapour-phase epitaxy (HVPE) is the only III–V and III–N semiconductor crystal growth process working close to equilibrium. This means that the condensation reactions exhibit fast kinetics: one observes immediate reactivity to an increase of the vapour-phase supersaturation towards condensation. This property is due to the use of chloride vapour precursors GaCl and InCl, of which dechlorination frequency is high enough so that there is no kinetic delay. A wide range of growth rates, from 1 to 100 micrometers per hour, can then be set as a function of the vapour-phase supersaturation. Another HVPE feature is that growth is governed by surface kinetics: adsorption of gaseous precursors, decomposition of ad-species, desorption of decomposition products, surface diffusion towards kink sites. This property is of benefit when it comes to selective growth on patterned substrates for the synthesis of objects and structures exhibiting a 3D morphology. The morphology is only dependent on the intrinsic growth anisotropy of crystals. By setting experimental growth parameters of temperature and composition of the vapour phase, one can control this anisotropy, which can be very high as growth rates can be varied by an order of magnitude. Therefore, we can shape structures with various novel aspect ratios. The accurate control of growth morphology was used for the making of GaN quasi-substrates, arrays of GaAs and GaN structures on the micrometer and submicrometer scales, GaAs tips for local spin injection. Fast dechlorination property is also used for the VLS growth of GaAs and GaN nanowires with exceptional length.
