= King Leo =

King Leo may refer to:

- Leo I, King of Armenia (1150–1219), sometimes also referred to as Leo II, to be distinguished from Leo I, Prince of Armenia
- Leo II, King of Armenia (1236–1289), sometimes also referred to as Leo III
- Leo III of Armenia (1286–1307), sometimes also referred to as Leo IV
- Leo IV of Armenia (1309–1341), sometimes also referred to as Leo V
- Leo V of Armenia (1342–1393), sometimes also referred to as Leo VI
- King Leo, main antagonist in the videogame Savage Reign
