= The Morning After (novel) =

Novel by Iranian author Fattaneh Haj Seyed Javadi

- Author: Fattaneh Haj Seyed Javadi
- Original title: بامداد خمار
- Translator: Firouz Media (publisher)
- Language: Persian
- Genre: Novel
- Publisher: Nashr-e Alborz
- Publication date: 1995
- Publication place: Iran
- English publication date: 2022
- Pages: 440
- ISBN: 964-442-256-2

The Morning After (Persian: بامداد خمار, lit. Bamdad-e Khomar) and also as Drunkard Morning, is a novel by Iranian author Fattaneh Haj Seyed Javadi, first published in 1995. The story depicts a tragic love between a young aristocratic woman and a carpenter from the lower class. It became one of the best-selling novels of contemporary Iranian literature and is often cited as a representative example of modern popular fiction in Iran.

== Publication and reception ==
The Morning After reportedly sold about 150,000 copies within its first two years, and reached an estimated total of 300,000 copies during the first decade after its publication, with some editions having print runs ranging from 10,000 to 18,000 copies. The novel provoked strong reactions: supporters considered it a useful moral tale about love and social boundaries, while critics accused it of defending upper-class privilege and demeaning the lower classes.

A German translation by Susan Baghstani was published in Germany with several reprints. An English translation titled The Morning After, translated by Niloufar Madjlessi, was published by Firouz Media in 2022.

== Plot summary ==
Soudabeh is a young educated woman coming from a wealthy family who wants to marry a man whose social class is lower than her family's. To prevent this, Soudabeh's mother urges her to learn from Mahboubeh, her aunt. Bamdad-e Khomar tells the tragic story of Mahboubeh's, the daughter of the cultured and aristocratic Basir al-Molk, who falls in love with a carpenter's apprentice named Rahim. Despite her family’s objections, she insists on marrying him and is subsequently disowned. Mahboubeh's father buys the couple a small house and a workshop for Rahim's carpentry, but Rahim soon spends their income on drinking and becomes abusive. Mahboubeh’s mother-in-law dominates their household, humiliates Mahboubeh, and destroys what remains of her dignity. Mahboubeh gives birth to a son, miscarries her second child, and is left permanently infertile. Her five-year-old son drowns in the neighbor's pool due to her mother-in-law's negligence. After seven years of suffering, Mahboubeh escapes from her husband and mother-in-law and takes refuge with her father again. Nothing but hatred remains of that love. She gets a divorce and marries her cousin Mansour, who had proposed to her years before and now has a wife and children, Mahboubeh becoming his second wife. After the marriage, she gradually falls in love with Mansour but isn't able to produce children. She sees the consequences of her own actions and whims in being childless and the second wife of the man of her dreams, and she realizes that disobeying her parents leads to misfortune.

== Related works ==
Following the success of Bamdad-e Khomar, a novel titled Shab Sarāb (Night Mirage) by Nahid A. Pezhvak was published by the same publisher, Nashr Alborz. It retells the same story from Rahim’s point of view. Javadi sued Pezhvak for plagiarism, and the controversy boosted sales of both books.

== Adaptations ==
In 2025, a television adaptation titled Bamdad-e Khomar was released, written by Hossein Kiani and streamed on the Shida platform. The theme song, sung by Mohsen Chavoshi, used lyrics by Hafez and was also titled Bamdad-e Khomar.

== See also ==
- List of Iranian women writers
