= Leo, West Virginia =

Coordinates: 38°44′39″N 81°25′01″W

Leo is an extinct town in Roane County, in the U.S. state of West Virginia.

== History ==
Variant names were Lonewillow and Pratt. A post office called Pratt was established in 1888, the name was changed to Leo in 1901, the name was changed yet again to Lonewillow in 1925, and the post office closed in 1936. Leo was named after a local girl.
