= Ballmaster Open =

Annual ten-pin bowling tournament

The Brunswick Ballmaster Open is an annual ten-pin bowling tournament.

The first tournament took place in 1971, with Josef Wiener from Sweden winning First Place at the Sporthall Bowl in Helsinki. The event then moved to the Ruusula Center in 1972, before making the Tali Bowl its home from 1974 onward.

The events has €83,000 of total prize fund, with the first prize of €10,000.

It is the first European Bowling Tour (EBT) ranking event of 2006.
