= Leo Zhedenov =

Leo Zhedenov (born in 1883, Saint Petersburg, Russian Empire – 1959, Lyon, France) was a participant of the Russian apostolate in the 20th century.

== Biography ==
Until 1917 Leo Zhedenov worked as assistant in the Prosecutor Court of Justice in Saint Petersburg, then emigrated to Constantinople, where he met with Hieromonk Stanislav Tyszkiewicz SJ and lived in Dorm to Russian Catholics in Constantinople, who are in a dark, almost the basement of the old house of Genoa, next to the board of Saint George's boarding school in Meudon, arranged by the Jesuits. Zhedenov held here apostolic lectures and was the head of this hostel. Zhedenov graduated from the Catholic Institute of Paris, and then in 1928 he was ordained a priest and sent to Lyon to work with Russian immigrants, where he began to serve in the Byzantine rite in the local Roman Catholic churches of Saint Alban and Saint Peter. With the blessing of Bishop Michel d'Herbigny he created Russian Catholic parish in Lyon. By 1930 the choir was organized, also speaking with concerts of classical and folk music. Chorus drove the first wave of immigrants. On December 18, 1932 was consecrated the house of the church, designed for 70–80 people, with oak iconostasis at Auguste Comte Street. The temple was dedicated to the patron saint Irenaeus. Father Zhedenov remained the parish until 1937, when it was replaced by Nicholas Bratko. Zhedenov went into retirement for health reasons, and died in Lyon in 1959.

== Publications ==
Zhedenov Lion, Fr. Letter from 19.04.1937 / / Notes Russian Ecclesiastical Academy in Rome. Rome. 1937, 6. with. 2-7.

== Sources ==
Reports from the field / / Blagovest . Paris . 1930, Part 1. with. 158.

Chronicle: Lyon, Consecration of the Catholic Church of Eastern Rite / / Blagovest . Paris . 1932, № 8. with. 84.
