= Léo Rodrigues (footballer, born 1991) =

Brazilian footballer

Personal information
- Full name: Leonardo Rodrigues
- Date of birth: 6 April 1991 (age 35)
- Place of birth: Caçador, Brazil
- Height: 1.77 m (5 ft 10 in)
- Position: Right-back

Youth career
- Figueirense

Senior career*
Years	Team	Apps	(Gls)
2010–2015	Figueirense	6	(0)
2011	→ Duque de Caxias (loan)	26	(1)
2013	→ Boavista (loan)	5	(0)
2013	→ Tombense (loan)	0	(0)
2013	→ Fortaleza (loan)	10	(1)
2014	→ Tombense (loan)	0	(0)
2014	→ Vila Nova (loan)	29	(2)
2015–2016	Sampaio Corrêa	13	(0)
2017	Tombense	9	(0)
2017	Macaé	4	(0)
2017–2018	Vila Nova	29	(0)
2019	Marcílio Dias	3	(0)
2020	Imperatriz	4	(0)
- * Club domestic league appearances and goals as of 26 September 2020

Leonardo 'Léo' Rodrigues (born 6 April 1991) is a Brazilian footballer who plays as a right-back.

== Career ==
Born in Caçador, Santa Catarina, Léo Rodrigues graduated with Figueirense's youth setup, making his senior debuts in 2011 in Campeonato Catarinense. In May 2011 he was loaned to Duque de Caxias, in Série B.

Léo Rodrigues made his professional debut on 28 May 2011, starting in a 2–1 home loss against Criciúma. He scored his first goal for Duque on 16 August, netting the first in a 2–1 home win against ASA.

Léo Rodrigues returned to Figueira in 2012, after suffering relegation with Duque de Caxias. He made his Série A debut on 8 August 2012, starting in a 2–0 home loss against Flamengo. He only appeared rarely with the side, again suffering another drop.

Léo Rodrigues was subsequently loaned to Boavista, Tombense (two spells), Fortaleza and Vila Nova. On 27 January 2015, he returned to Figueirense, being added to the main squad for the pre-season.
