= Leo (2002 film) =

- Directed by: Mehdi Norowzian
- Written by: Massy Tadjedin; Amir Tadjedin
- Produced by: Erica August; Jonathan Karlsen; Massy Tadjedin
- Starring: Elisabeth Shue; Joseph Fiennes; Dennis Hopper; Sam Shepard
- Cinematography: Zubin Mistry
- Edited by: Tariq Anwar
- Music by: Mark Adler
- Production companies: Freewheel Productions; Joy Films; Scala Productions
- Distributed by: First Look Studios
- Release date: September 11, 2002 (Toronto)
- Running time: 104 minutes
- Countries: United States; United Kingdom
- Language: English

Leo is a 2002 British-American drama film directed by Mehdi Norowzian and starring Elisabeth Shue, Joseph Fiennes, Dennis Hopper and Sam Shepard.

== Cast ==
- Joseph Fiennes as Stephen
- Elisabeth Shue as Mary Bloom
- Justin Chambers as Ryan Eames
- Deborah Kara Unger as Caroline
- Mary Stuart Masterson as Brynne
- Jake Weber as Ben Bloom
- Dennis Hopper as Horace
- Sam Shepard as Vic
