= Léo Rodrigues (footballer, born 1999) =

Portuguese footballer

Personal information
- Full name: Leonardo Santos Rodrigues
- Date of birth: 7 January 1999 (age 27)
- Place of birth: Olhão, Portugal
- Height: 1.86 m (6 ft 1 in)
- Position: Goalkeeper

Team information
- Current team: Melilla
- Number: 1

Youth career
- 2007–: Olhanense

Senior career*
Years	Team	Apps	(Gls)
2016–2017	Olhanense	8	(0)
2018	Marítimo	0	(0)
2018–2019	Don Benito	13	(0)
2019–	Melilla	5	(0)
- * Club domestic league appearances and goals as of 4 April 2021

Leonardo Santos Rodrigues (born 7 January 1999) is a Portuguese footballer who plays for UD Melilla as a goalkeeper.

== Career ==
Rodrigues was born in Olhão.

On 9 January 2016, he made his professional debut with Olhanense in a 2015–16 Segunda Liga match against Benfica B. After appearing in eight matches with Olhanense and a brief spell in the C.S. Marítimo reserves, he signed with Segunda División B side CD Don Benito.
