= Leopold =

Leopold may refer to:

== People ==
- Leopold (given name), including a list of people named Leopold or Léopold
- Leopold (surname)
- Prince Leopold (disambiguation)

== Fictional characters ==
- Leopold (The Simpsons), Superintendent Chalmers' assistant on The Simpsons
- Leopold Bloom, the protagonist of James Joyce's Ulysses
- Leopold "Leo" Fitz, on the television series Agents of S.H.I.E.L.D.
- Leopold "Butters" Stotch, on the television series South Park
- General Leopold von Flockenstuffen, on the BBC sitcom 'Allo 'Allo!
- Leopold the Cat, the protagonist of a Soviet/Russian animated short film series
- Leopold, 3rd Duke of Albany, a lead character of Kate & Leopold, a 2001 romantic comedy film
- Leopold Slikk, an alias of Norman Kochanowski known for Angry German Kid

== Businesses ==
- Leopold (publisher), a Netherlands-based publishing company
- Leopold Bros., an American micro-distiller
- Leopold Cafe, Colaba, Mumbai, India (attacked during the 26 November 2008 Mumbai attacks)
- Leopold's Ice Cream, an American business

== Military ==
- Leopold, a German World War II Krupp K5 railway gun
- USS Leopold (DE-319), a World War II American destroyer escort
- Belgian frigate Leopold I (F930)

== Places ==
=== Australia ===
- Leopold, Victoria, a suburb of Geelong
- King Leopold Ranges, now named Wunaamin Miliwundi Ranges, a range of hills in Western Australia

=== Belgium ===
- Espace Léopold, buildings housing the European Parliament, Brussels
- Leopold Canal (Belgium)
- Leopold Park, a public park in Brussels
- Leopold Quarter, a district of Brussels

=== United States ===
- Leopold Township, Perry County, Indiana
  - Leopold, Indiana, an unincorporated community within the township
- Leopold, Missouri
- Leopold, West Virginia
- Leopold Hotel, Bellingham, Washington

=== Elsewhere ===
- Leopold Museum, Vienna, Austria
- Leopold Island, Nunavut, Canada
- Leopold Square, Sheffield, England, a mixed development
- Leopold Canal (Baden-Württemberg), Germany
- Leopold, Grand'Anse, Haiti, a village

== Awards and honors ==
- Leopold (prize), a biennial German prize for music for children
- Order of Leopold (disambiguation), various ceremonial orders

== See also ==
- Luitpold (disambiguation)
- Royal Léopold Club, a Belgian sports club in Uccle
- R. Léopold Uccle Forestoise, a Belgian football club formed from merger of Léopold Club with other teams
- Port Leopold, Nunavut, Canada, an abandoned trading post
- Leopold's maneuvers, an obstetrics technique
- Leopoldville (disambiguation)
- Leopoldina (disambiguation)
