= Leopold (given name) =

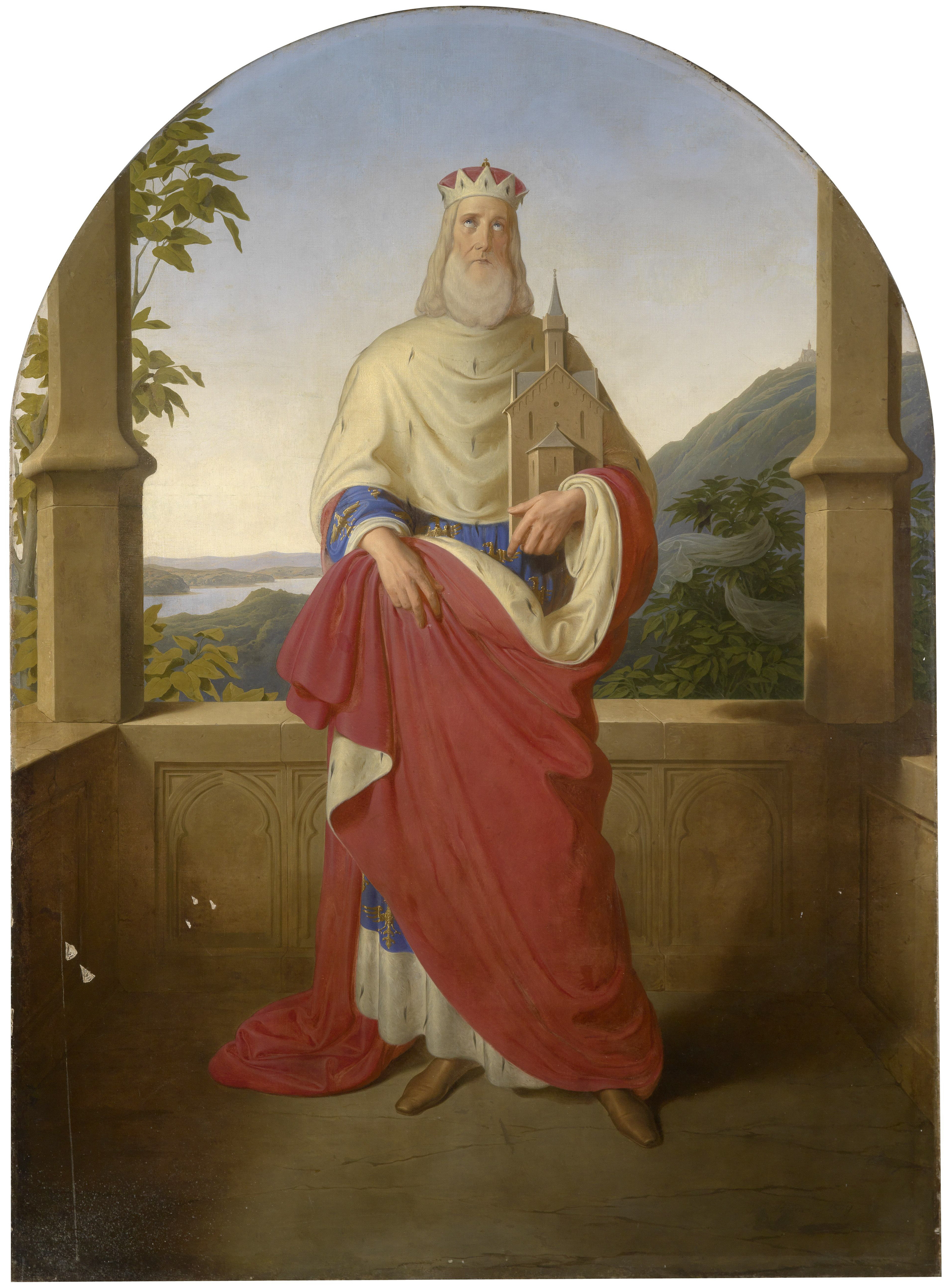
- Leopold III, Margrave of Austria, is the patron saint of Austria, Lower Austria, Upper Austria, and Vienna. This painting was composed by Wilhelm August Rieder in 1849.
- Gender: Male
- Languages: English, German, Dutch

Other gender
- Feminine: Leopoldine

Origin
- Origin: Central Europe

Other names
- Alternative spelling: Léopold
- Related names: Leo, Leopoldo, Lepold, Leupold, Luitbald, Luitpold

Leopold is the modern form of the Germanic name Luitbald, composed of two stems, common to Germanic names. The first part is related to Old High German liut meaning "people", the second part bald or balt is of Germanic origin and means "brave". The name is not related to the names Leon and Leonard which mean lion. The name gradually spread across Western Europe and during the 16th century it became popular in the southern Holy Roman Empire, due to the influence of the Margraves of Austria from the Babenberg dynasty.

Over a dozen Austrian rulers took the name, as did nearly a dozen from other European realms.

== Artists ==
- Leopold Blaschka (1822–1895), German glass artist
- Leopold Scholz (1877–1946), American sculptor
- Léopold Zborowski (1889–1932), Polish art dealer

== Businessmen ==
- Leopold David de Rothschild (1927–2012), British banker
- Leopold de Rothschild (1845–1917), British banker
- Léopold Louis-Dreyfus (1833–1915), French investor and businessman

== Literary figures ==
- Leopold Andrian (1875−1951), Austrian author, dramatist and diplomat
- Leopold Friedrich Günther von Goeckingk (1748–1828), German lyric poet, journalist, and Prussian official
- Leopold Engel (1858–1931), German writer and occultist
- Leopold Schefer (1784–1862), German poet, novelist, and composer
- Leopold Schwarzschild (1891–1950), German author
- Leopold Staff (1878–1957), Polish poet
- Leopold Suhodolčan (1928–1980), Slovene writer
- Leopold Tyrmand (1920–1985), Polish novelist, writer, and editor
- Leopold von Ranke (1795–1886), German historian and a founder of modern source-based history
- Leopold von Sacher-Masoch (1836–1895), Austrian writer and journalist
- Leopold Zunz (1794–1886), founder of academic Judaic Studies

== Mathematicians ==
- Leopold Gegenbauer (1849–1903), Austrian mathematician
- Leopold Kronecker (1823–1891), German mathematician
- Leopold Löwenheim (1878–1957), German mathematician
- Leopold Vietoris (1891–2002), Austrian mathematician

== Military ==
- Leopold von Rauch (1787–1860), major general in the Prussian Army

== Movie industry ==
- Leopold Biberti (1894–1969), Swiss actor
- Leopold Jessner (1878–1945), German director
- Leopold Kramer (1869–1942), Austrian stage and film actor
- Leopold Lindtberg (1902–1984), Austrian Swiss film and theatre director

== Musicians ==
- Leopold Auer (1845–1930), Hungarian conductor and composer
- Leopold Damrosch (1832–1885), German American conductor and composer
- Leopold Godowsky (1870–1938), American pianist and composer
- Leopold Godowsky Jr. (1900–1983), American violinist and chemist
- Leopold Hager (born 1935), Austrian conductor
- Leopold Hofmann (1738–1793), Austrian composer
- Leopold Koželuch (1747–1818), Czech composer and music teacher
- Leopold Mannes (1899–1964), American musician
- Leopold Mozart (1719–1787), German conductor and composer
- Leopold Ross, English musician
- Léopold Simoneau (1916–2006), French-Canadian lyric tenor
- Leopold Spinner (1906–1980), Austrian British composer and editor
- Leopold Stokowski (1882–1977), British conductor
- Leopold Wlach (1902–1956), Austrian clarinetist

== Other ==
- Leopold Chasseriau (1825–1891), French planter
- Léopold Dion (1920–1972), Canadian sex offender and serial killer
- Leopold Engleitner (1905–2013), Austrian conscientious objector and concentration camp survivor
- Leopold Halliday Savile (1870–1953), Scottish civil engineer
- Leopold Pokagon (c. 1775–1841), Potawatomi chief
- Leopold von Sonnleithner (1797–1873), Austrian lawyer

== Philosophical figures ==
- Leopold Kohr (1909–1994), Austrian American economist, jurist and political scientist
- Leopold von Henning (1791–1866), German philosopher

== Political figures ==
- Leopold Berchtold (1863–1942), Austro-Hungarian politician, diplomat and statesman
- Léopold Biha (1919–2003), Burundian prime minister
- Leopold Caspari (1830–1915), Louisiana politician
- Leopold Hasner von Artha (1818–1891), Austrian civil servant and statesman
- Léopold Sédar Senghor (1906–2001), first president of Senegal
- Leopold Seneviratne, Sri Lankan civil servant
- Leopold Trepper (1904–1982), Polish Communist and career Soviet agent
- Leopold von Hoesch (1881–1936), career German diplomat

== Religious figures ==
- Saint Leopold (disambiguation)

== Royalty ==
- King Leopold (disambiguation)
- Leopold I (disambiguation)
- Leopold II (disambiguation)
- Leopold III (disambiguation)
- Leopold IV (disambiguation)
- Leopold V (disambiguation)
- Leopold VI, Duke of Austria (1176–1230)
- Leopold, Duke of Lorraine (1679 –1729)
- Leopold of Styria (died 1129)
- Prince Leopold (disambiguation)

== Scientists ==
- Leopold Auenbrugger (1722–1809), Austrian physician
- Leopold B. Felsen (1924–2005), American physicist
- Léopold Eyharts (born 1957), French astronaut
- Leopold Gmelin (1788–1853), German chemist
- Leopold Horner (1911–2005), German chemist
- Leopold Infeld (1898–1968), Polish physicist
- Leopold Melichar (1856–1924), Czech entomologist and physician
- Leopold Ritter von Dittel (1815–1898), Austrian urologist
- Leopold Ružička (1887–1976), Croatian-Swiss scientist
- Leopold Saverio Vaccaro, American surgeon and scientist
- Leopold Schenk (1840–1902), Austrian embryologist
- Leopold von Schrenck (1826–1894), Russian zoologist, geographer and ethnographer

== Sportsmen ==
- Léopold Cavalière (born 1996), French basketball player
- Léopold Gernaey (1927–2005), Belgian goalkeeper
- Leopold Wahlstedt (born 1999), Swedish footballer

== Fictional characters ==
- Leopold "Butters" Stotch, character from South Park
- Leopold Bloom, character from James Joyce book Ulysses (novel)

== See also ==
- Leopold (surname)
- Leopold (disambiguation)
