= James Cowles Prichard =

English physician and anthropologist (1786–1848)

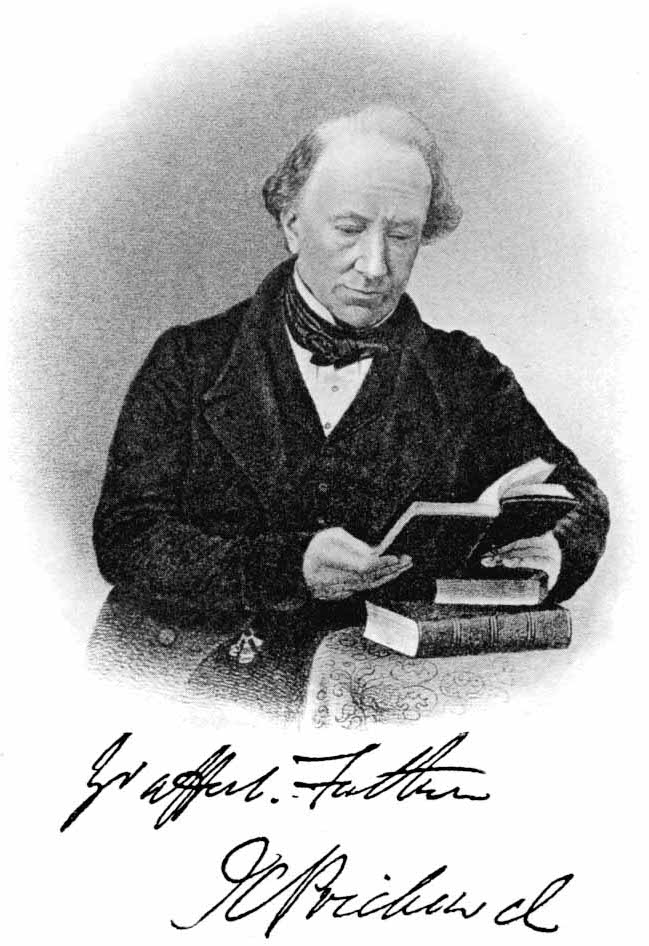
James Cowles Prichard.

James Cowles Prichard FRS (11 February 1786 – 23 December 1848) was a British medical doctor and ethnologist with broad interests in physical anthropology and psychiatry. His influential Researches into the Physical History of Mankind touched upon the subject of evolution. From 1845, Prichard served as a Medical Commissioner in Lunacy. He also introduced the term "senile dementia".

== Life ==
Prichard was born in Ross-on-Wye, Herefordshire. His parents Thomas and Mary Prichard were Quakers: his mother was Welsh, and his father was of an English family who had emigrated to Pennsylvania, which had been founded by Quakers. Within a few years of his birth in Ross, Prichard's parents moved to Bristol, where his father now worked in the Quaker ironworks of Harford, Partridge and Cowles. Upon his father's retirement in 1800 he returned to Ross. As a child Prichard was educated mainly at home by tutors and his father, in a range of subjects, including modern languages and general literature.

Rejecting his father's wish that he should join the ironworks business, Prichard decided upon a medical career. Here he faced the difficulty that as a Quaker he could not become a member of the Royal College of Physicians. Therefore, he started on apprenticeships that led to the ranks of apothecaries and surgeons, first studying under the Quaker obstetrician Dr Thomas Pole of Bristol. Apprenticeships followed to other Quaker physicians, and to St Thomas' Hospital in London. In 1805, he entered medical school at Edinburgh University, where his religious affiliation was no bar. Also, the Scottish medical schools were held in esteem, having contributed greatly to the Enlightenment of the previous century.

He took his M.D. at Edinburgh, his doctoral thesis of 1808 being his first attempt at the great question of his life: the origin of human varieties and races. Later, he read for a year at Trinity College, Cambridge, after which came a significant personal event: he left the Society of Friends to join the established Church of England. He next moved to St John's College, Oxford, afterwards entering as a gentleman commoner at Trinity College, Oxford, but taking no degree in either university.

In 1810 Prichard settled at Bristol as a physician, eventually attaining an established position at the Bristol Infirmary (BRI) in 1816. While working at the BRI, Prichard lived in the Red Lodge. This was also where he wrote Researches into the Physical History of Man.

In 1845 he was made one of the three medical Commissioners in Lunacy, having previously been one of the Metropolitan Commissioners, and moved to London. He died there three years later of rheumatic fever. At the time of his death he was president of the Ethnological Society and a Fellow of the Royal Society. (Note: Prichard was elected FRS in 1826 or 1827: Royal Society records give both dates.)

== Work ==
In 1813 he published his Researches into the Physical History of Man, in two volumes, on essentially the same themes as his dissertation in 1808. The book grew until the third edition of 1836–1847 occupied five volumes. The second to the fourth editions were published under the title Researches into the Physical History of Mankind. The fourth edition was also in five volumes.

The central conclusion of the work is the unity of the human species, which has been acted upon by causes which have since divided it into permanent varieties or races. The work is dedicated to Johann Friedrich Blumenbach, whose five races of man are adopted. Prichard differed from Blumenbach and other predecessors by the principle that people should be studied by combining all available characters.

=== Evolution ===
Three British men, all medically qualified and publishing between 1813 and 1819, William Lawrence, William Charles Wells and Prichard, addressed issues relevant to human evolution. All tackled the question of variation and race in humans; all agreed that these differences were heritable, but only Wells approached the idea of natural selection as a cause.

Science historian Conway Zirkle has described Prichard as an evolutionary thinker who came very close "to explaining the origin of new forms through the operation of natural selection although he never actually stated the proposition in so many words."

Prichard indicated Africa (indirectly) as the place of human origin, in this summary passage:

"On the whole there are many reasons which lead us to the conclusion that the primitive stock of men were probably Negroes, and I know of no argument to be set on the other side."

This opinion was omitted in later editions. The second edition includes more developed evolutionary ideas.

=== Anthropology ===
Prichard was influential in the early days of ethnology and anthropology. He stated that the Celtic languages are allied by language with the Slavonian, German and Pelasgian (Greek and Latin), thus forming a fourth European branch of Indo-European languages. His treatise containing Celtic compared with Sanskrit words appeared in 1831 under the title Eastern Origin of the Celtic Nations. An essay by Adolphe Pictet, which made its author's reputation, was published independently of the earlier investigations of Prichard.

In 1843 Prichard published his Natural History of Man, in which he reiterated his belief in the specific unity of man, pointing out that the same inward and mental nature can be recognized in all the races. Prichard was an early member of the Aborigines' Protection Society.

=== Psychiatry ===
In medicine, he specialised in what is now psychiatry. In 1822 he published A Treatise on Diseases of the Nervous System (pt. I), and in 1835 a Treatise on Insanity and Other Disorders Affecting the Mind, in which he advanced the theory of the existence of a distinct mental illness called moral insanity. Prichard's work was also the first definition of senile dementia in the English language. Augstein has suggested that these works were aimed at the prevalent materialist theories of mind, phrenology and craniology. She has also suggested that Prichard was influenced by the somatic school of German Romantic psychiatric thought, in particular Christian Friedrich Nasse, and (eclectically) Johann Christian August Heinroth; this in addition to an acknowledged debt to Jean-Étienne Dominique Esquirol.

In 1842, following up on moral insanity, he published On the Different Forms of Insanity in Relation to Jurisprudence, designed for the use of persons concerned in legal questions regarding unsoundness of mind.

=== Other works ===
Among his other works were:

- 1819: Analysis of Egyptian Mythology
- 1829: A Review of the Doctrine of a Vital Principle
- 1831: On the Treatment of Hemiplegia
- 1839: On the Extinction of some Varieties of the Human Race

== Family ==
He married Anne Maria Estlin, daughter of John Prior Estlin and sister of John Bishop Estlin. They had ten children, eight of whom survived infancy, including Augustin Prichard (b. 1818, d. 1898), Constantine Estlin Prichard (b.1820), Theodore Joseph Prichard (b.1821), Illtiodus Thomas Prichard (b. 1825), Edith Prichard (b. 1829) and Albert Herman Prichard (b.1831).

== Archives ==
Documents including medical certificates relating to Prichard and his second son, Augustin Prichard, are held at Bristol Archives (Ref. 16082) (online catalogue). Records relating to Prichard can also be found at the Wellcome Library and the Royal Geographical Society.

== Sources ==
- Augstein, Hannah Franziska. James Cowles Prichard's Anthropology: remaking the science of Man in early nineteenth-century Britain. Amsterdam: Rodopi, 1999. ISBN 90-420-0414-2; ISBN 90-420-0404-5 (pbk)
- Sera-Shriar, Efram, The Making of British Anthropology, 1813-1871, London: Pickering and Chatto, 2013, pp. 21–52.
- Memoir by Dr Thomas Hodgkin (1798–1866) in Journal of the Ethnological Society (1849).
- Memoir by John Addington Symonds, Journal of the Ethnological Society (1850).
- Prichard and Symonds in Special Relation to Mental Science, by Daniel Hack Tuke (1891).
- Stocking, George W. Jr 1973. "From chronology to ethnology: James Cowles Prichard and British Anthropology 1800–1850". Introduction to the reprint of Researches into the Physical History of Man, 1st ed 1813. Chicago, 1973.
- Symonds, John Addington 1871. "On the life, writings and character of the late James Cowles Prichard". In Miscellanies ... of Symonds, edited by his son, London: Macmillan.
