= Damerow (surname) =

Damerow is a surname. Notable people with the surname include:

- Astrid Damerow (born 1958), German politician
- Gail Damerow (born 1944), American writer
- Heinrich Philipp August Damerow (1798–1866), German psychiatrist
