= Psychical school =

School of thought in psychiatry

The psychical school or psychic school was a school of thought in eighteenth, nineteenth and early twentieth century psychiatry that held insanity to be solely caused by psychological (as opposed to bodily) disorder. Early representatives included English surgeon Andrew Harper (?–1790), and German psychiatrists Johann Gottfried Langermann (1768–1832), Johann Heinroth (1773–1843) and Karl Wilhelm Ideler (1795–1860).

Harper concluded that "actual insanity ... seldom arises from any other source than a defection of the mind alone." Langermann called all mental illness a disorder of the spirit. Heinroth developed a "theological psychiatry", arguing that all mental illness is due to moral failing—a weakness of will—and he rejected the idea that bodily pathology may play any role. He asserted that "Innocence will not be perverted into insanity; ... but the soul laden with sin" will be ... "derangement of the mind has its sole origin in the abuse and misuse of freedom." Ideler argued, according to Berthold-Bond, that all mental illness is "a purely psychological phenomenon, a disease of the soul."

== See also ==
- Somatic school which argues for a physical cause of mental illness
- Functional neurological symptom disorder
- Organic brain syndrome, not recognized by this theory
