= Andreas Ernst Gottfried Polysius =

Andreas Ernst Gottfried Polysius (born 27 November 1827 in Dessau; † 21 April 1886 ) was a German Industrialist.

== Family ==
Andreas Ernst Gottfried Polysius was born in Dessau the only son of Gottfried Polysius and Louise Sturm. His father was manager of a sheep farm in Dessau. His mother died at a young age. His father was soon remarried, to Louise Amelang, daughter of a lumber trader Gottfried Amelang and the Leopoldine Schmidt. From this marriage his father bore two sons, Andreas's half brothers: Gottfried Otto Polysius, * 27 September 1863, and Gottfried max of Polysius, * 19 March 1870.

== Life ==
Polysius began his education in Dessau. During his time at school he developed a fascination for the industrial processes gaining ascendency in Europe at the time; he structured his education accordingly. During the years of his education he traveled to Switzerland, to London and Paris. In 1859, he began an apprentice at a workshop in Dessau and thereby laid the foundation-stone for the multi-national engineering firm Polysius AG. He began his career by making safes.

On 23 May 1870, he created G. Polysius, an iron foundry and engine works, where he designed and manufactured high performance mills for the infant building materials industry. The factory started with 32 workers. In 1875, he began distribution of forge-iron gates in Dessau. During this time he developed an uncommon love for music and theatre which led to a notable friendship with Duke Friedrich I.

In 1876, he began production of threshing machines, sawing mills and steam engines. During this time he also began production of agricultural machines such as corn mills and breweries. He was now producing a range of industrial machinery. On 21 April 1886, during a performance of Tannhäuser in his beloved Dessauer Theatre, Gottfried Polysius succumbed to a cardiac infarction.

== Legacy ==
His heirs continued to run his company and began to specialize in machines necessary for the construction of cement works. In 1898, it built the first cylindrical rotary cement kiln in Europe and in 1907 a complete cement plant in Egypt. They continued through Nazi Germany

After World War II, it moved from its home in Dessau to Beckum in Westphalia. The company is known in the 21st century as Polysius AG.
