= Van Beneden =

van Beneden can refer to the following people:

- Pierre-Joseph van Beneden (1809–1894) Belgian zoologist and paleontologist
- Edouard Van Beneden (1846–1910) (Pierre-Joseph's son) Belgian embryologist, cytologist and marine biologist
