= Rural Heritage =

US magazine

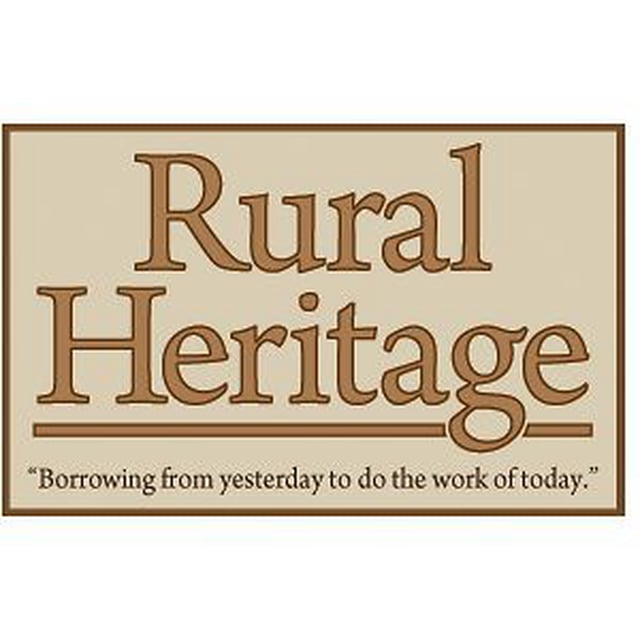
- Editor: Joe Mischka
- Frequency: Bimonthly
- Founded: 1976
- Company: Freiberg-Frederick Press
- Country: United States
- Based in: Cedar Rapids, Iowa
- Language: English
- Website: www.ruralheritage.com
- ISSN: 0889-2970

Rural Heritage is a bimonthly magazine published for America's past and present enthusiasts of animal power.

== History and profile ==
First published in 1976, the magazine was named The Evener. It serves small farmers and loggers who use draft horses, mules, and oxen in their business. The former headquarters was in Gainesboro, Tennessee. The headquarters of the magazine is in Cedar Rapids, Iowa. It is self-published on a small Iowa farm and distributes its issues mainly through direct mailing. Some farm and feed stores such as Tractor Supply also carry the magazine. Rural Heritage is currently edited by Joe Mischka. Previously, the magazine was edited by Gail Damerow.
