= Johann Michael Leupoldt =

German psychiatrist (1794-1874)

Johann Michael Leupoldt (November 11, 1794 – August 21, 1874) was a German psychiatrist born in Weißenstadt, Bavaria.

In 1818 he obtained his medical doctorate at the University of Erlangen, and following graduation taught classes at Erlangen in anatomy and physiology and also gave lectures on mental illness. In 1820 he received a grant from the Bavarian government to continue his education in psychiatry in Berlin. While working in the mental ward at the Charité, he made the acquaintanceship of Anton Ludwig Ernst Horn (1774–1848) and Johann Gottfried Langermann (1768–1832). In 1821 he became an associate professor at Erlangen, followed by a full professorship in 1826.

He was a primary force in creation of the first mental hospital in Bavaria (at Erlangen in 1845); its first director was Karl August von Solbrig. For 17 years Leupoldt was the chairman of the Erlanger Societas physica-medica.

== Written works ==
Leupoldt was the author of numerous medical works. He published scientific articles in Christian Friedrich Nasse's "Zeitschrift für psychische Ärzte" and in Johann Baptist Friedreich's "Magazin für Seelenkunde". The following are some of his better written efforts:

- Seelenheilkunde und Lebensmagnetismus, 1821 - Psychology and "life magnetism".
- Grundriß der allgemeinen Pathologie und Therapie, 1823 - Outline of general pathology and therapy.
- Ueber wohlfeile Irrenanstalten, ihre Beziehung zu Straf- und Zwang-Arbeitsanstalten einerseits und zu medicinischen Lehranstalten andrerseits; sowie über einige wichtige Beziehungen der psychischen Heilkunde zur gesammten Medicin. Palm & Enke, Erlangen, 1824 (Digital edition) - About inexpensive asylums, etc.
- Allgemeine Geschichte der Heilkunde, 1825 - General history of medical science.
- Popularphilosophie der Heilkunde, 1826 - Popular philosophy of medical science.
- Uber den Entwicklungsgang der Psychiatrie, 1833 - On the history of psychiatry.
- Die gesammte Anthropologie, 1834 - Complete anthropology.
- Lehrburch der Psychiatrie, 1837 - Textbook of psychiatry.
- Geschichte der Gesundheit und der Krankheiten, 1842 - History of wellness and illness.
- Lehrbuch der Theorie der Medicin, 1851 - Textbook on the theory of medicine.
- Über ärztliche Bildung und Bildungsanstalten, 1853 - On medical education and educational establishments.
