= Leupold (surname) =

Leupold is a surname, and may refer to:

- Bertha Henry Buxton, née Leupold (1844 - 1881), a British novelist and children's author
- Dagmar Leupold (born 1955), German writer
- Hans Leupold (? - 1528), German preacher
- Harald Leupold-Löwenthal (1926, Vienna - 2007), Austrian doctor
- Herbert Leupold (1908 - 1942), German cross country skier
- Hermann Leupold (born: Karel Vanek; 1900 - 1967), German editor
- Horst "Leo" Leupold (born 1942), German footballer
- Jacob Leupold (1674 - 1727), German physicist, scientist, and mathematician
- Markus Fredrick Leupold (1876 - 1944), Co-Founder of Leupold & Voelpel now Leupold & Stevens
- Matthias Leupold (born 1959, Berlin), German photographer
- Theodor Leupold (19th century), German cyclist

== Leupoldt ==
- Johann Michael Leupoldt
