= Leopoldville =

Leopoldville may refer to:

- Léopoldville, the capital of the Belgian colony of Congo, before it was renamed Kinshasa in 1966
- Léopoldville (ship), a number of ships by this name

== See also ==
- Leopoldstadt, a District of Vienna, Austria
- Leopoldov, a town in Slovakia
- Leopold Quarter, a quarter of Brussels, Belgium
- Leopold Township, Perry County, Indiana, a township in Indiana, United States
