= Leopold (surname) =

- Languages: English, German, Dutch

Origin
- Origin: Central Europe

Leopold is a surname. Notable people with the surname include:

- A. Fredric Leopold (1919–2008), American lawyer and politician
- Aldo Leopold (1887–1948), American author and scientist
- Chris Leopold (born 1968), Louisiana politician
- Ernst Leopold Prinz von Sachsen-Coburg und Gotha (1935–1996)
- Hendricus Leopold (1918–2008), Dutch diplomat
- J. H. Leopold (1865–1925), Dutch poet and classicist
- Johann Leopold, Hereditary Prince of Saxe-Coburg and Gotha (1906–1972)
- Josef Leopold (1889–1941), Austrian Nazi politician
- Juliane Leopold (born 1983), German journalist
- Luna Leopold (1915–2006), American geomorphologist and hydrologist
- Matthew Leopold, American attorney
- Nathan Leopold (1904–1971), American convicted of the 1924 kidnap and murder of Bobby Franks
- Wanda Leopold (1920–1977), Polish translator and social science activist

== See also ==
- Leopold (given name)
- Leopold (disambiguation)
