= Somatic school =

School of thought in psychiatry

Somatic school may refer to those in the nineteenth and early twentieth centuries who argued for a biological (as opposed to psychological) etiology of insanity; or it may refer to a group of nineteenth-century German psychiatrists, including Carl Jacobi, Christian Friedrich Nasse and Carl Friedrich Flemming, who taught that insanity is a symptom of biological diseases located outside the brain, particularly diseases of the abdominal and thoracic viscera (akin to the delirium caused by many acute biological illnesses). This latter German school opposed the "physiological school" represented in Germany by Wilhelm Roser, Wilhelm Griesinger and Carl Wunderlich, who insisted on there being a brain lesion underlying every case of insanity, even if in some instances that lesion is the product of a pre-existing, extra-cerebral biological illness and the psychical school of Johann Heinroth and others, who asserted that all insanity is the product of moral or psychological weakness and rejected any notion of a physical pathological cause.
