= Heinrich Philipp August Damerow =

German psychiatrist (1798–1866)

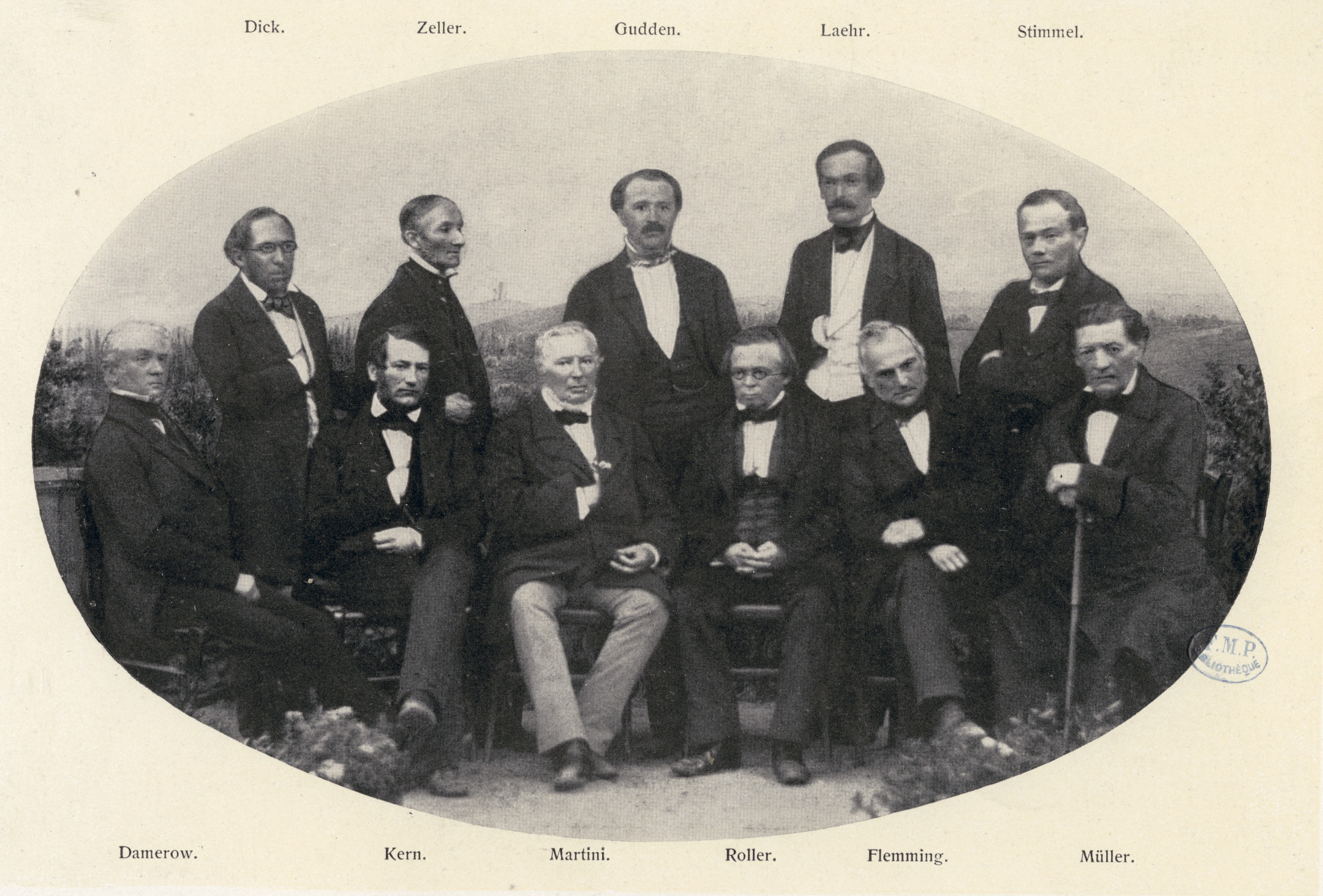

Heinrich Philipp August Damerow (28 December 1798 – 22 September 1866) was a German psychiatrist born in Stettin, Province of Pomerania, Prussia (today Szczecin, Poland). He made significant contributions in the field of institutional psychiatry.

In 1822 he earned his doctorate in Berlin, where he was a student of Friedrich Hegel, Friedrich Schleiermacher and psychiatrist Anton Ludwig Ernst Horn. He continued his education in Paris, where he studied under Jean-Étienne Dominique Esquirol, and at the Siegburg asylum north of Bonn, where he met with Carl Wigand Maximilian Jacobi. In 1830 he became an associate professor, and in 1836 was appointed director of Provinzial-Irrenanstalt (district mental asylum) near Halle. Two of his better-known assistants at the asylum were Rudolf Leubuscher (1822-1861) and Heinrich Laehr (1820-1905).

Damerow was one of the more influential German psychiatrists during the mid-19th century. He was an advocate of an holistic approach to treating mental illness, and felt that a physician must view the patient as a union of body, mind and soul. With Carl Friedrich Flemming (1799–1880) and Christian Friedrich Wilhelm Roller (1802–1878), he was co-founder of the psychiatric journal Allgemeine Zeitschrift für Psychiatrie.

== Selected writings ==
- Über die relative Verbindung der Irren-, Heil- und Pfleganstalten (Leipzig 1840) - About the relative connection of the insane, healing, and care institutions.
- Zur Kretinen- und Idiotenfrage (Berlin 1858) - Questions in regards to cretins and idiots.
- Über die Grundlage der Mimik und Physiognomie, als freier Beitrag zur Anthropologie und Psychiatrie (Berlin 1860) - On the basis of facial expressions and physiognomy, as a free contribution to anthropology and psychiatry.
