= European Archives of Psychiatry and Clinical Neuroscience =

- Discipline: Psychiatry, neurology
- Language: English
- Edited by: Peter Falkai

Publication details
- Former names: Archiv für Psychiatrie und Nervenkrankheiten; Zeitschrift für die gesamte Neurologie und Psychiatrie; European Archives of Psychiatry and Neurological Sciences
- History: 1868–present
- Publisher: Springer Science+Business Media
- Frequency: 8/year
- Impact factor: 5.8 (2021)

Standard abbreviations
- ISO 4: Eur. Arch. Psychiatry Clin. Neurosci.

Indexing
- ISSN: 0940-1334 (print); 1433-8491 (web)
- OCLC no.: 613502930

Links
- Journal homepage; Online archive; Online archive of Zeitschrift für die gesamte Neurologie und Psychiatrie

European Archives of Psychiatry and Clinical Neuroscience is a peer-reviewed medical journal published eight times a year by Springer Science+Business Media.

== History ==
The journal was established in 1868 by the German neurologist and psychiatrist Wilhelm Griesinger as the Archiv für Psychiatrie und Nervenkrankheiten (English: Archives of Psychiatry and Nerve Diseases. From 1869, its editors-in-chief were Bernhard von Gudden and Karl Friedrich Otto Westphal. From 1984 to 1989, the journal was named European Archives of Psychiatry and Neurological Sciences, before obtaining its current title in 1990. In 1947, after a publication hiatus since 1944, the journal merged with the Zeitschrift für die gesamte Neurologie und Psychiatrie, which had been published independently since 1910. The merged journal continued the volume numbering of the latter journal. The main fields of interest of the journal include Psychiatry (psychopathology, clinical psychiatry, epidemiology), Neuroscience (neuropathology, neurophysiology, neurochemistry, neuropsychology, neuroimaging, neurogenetics, molecular biology, animal models). European Archives of Psychiatry and Clinical Neuroscience has consistently been placed as a Q1 since 1999 in Medicine (miscellaneous), Pharmacology (medical), and Psychiatry and Mental Health.

== Abstracting and indexing ==
The journal is abstracted and indexed in:

- Science Citation Index
- PubMed/Medline
- Scopus
- PsycINFO
- EMBASE
- Academic OneFile
- Academic Search
- Current Contents/Life Sciences
- Current Contents/Clinical Medicine

According to the Journal Citation Reports, the journal has a 2014 impact factor of 3.525.
