= Rudolf Leubuscher =

German physician and psychiatrist

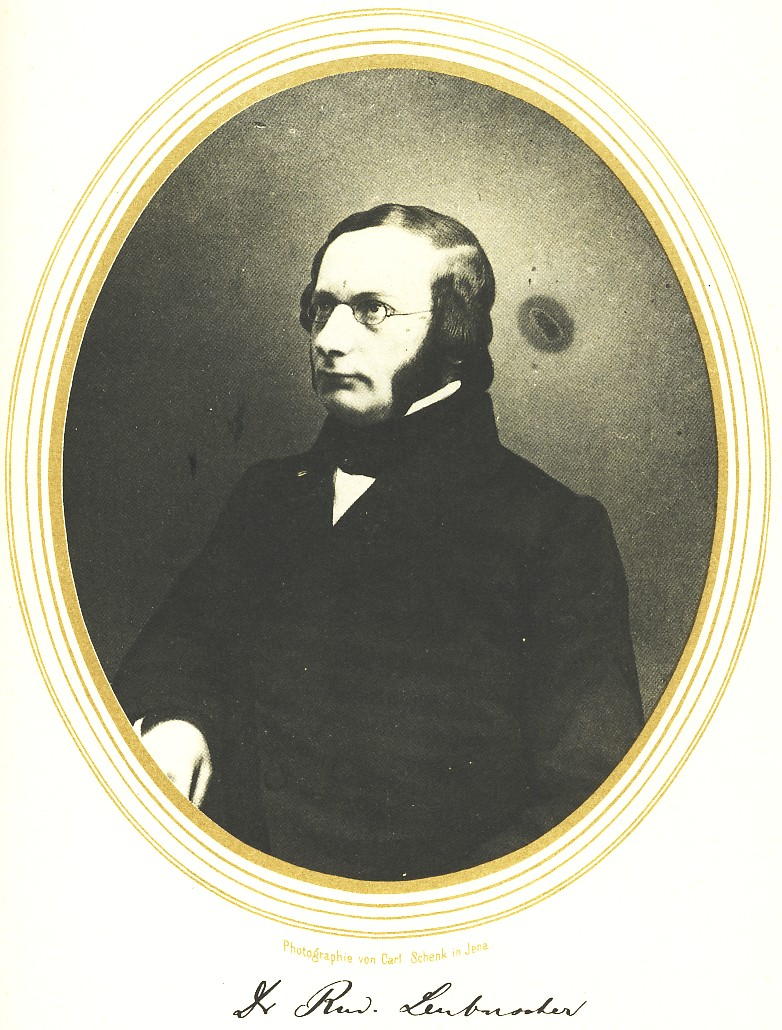
- Born: 12 December 1822; Breslau
- Died: 23 October 1861 (aged 38); Berlin
- Occupations: physician and psychiatrist

Rudolf Ludwig Otto Leubuscher (12 December 1822 – 23 October 1861) was a German medical doctor and psychiatrist who was a native of Breslau.

He obtained his medical doctorate in 1844 with the dissertation, De indole hallucinationum in mania religiosa, afterwards serving as an assistant to Heinrich Philipp August Damerow (1798-1866) at the newly constructed provincial mental institution in Halle. In 1848 he became habilitated at Humboldt University of Berlin, and in 1855 was a director at the medical clinic in Jena. He later returned to Berlin as a physician and associate professor at the university. He died in Berlin in 1861 at the age of 39.

Leubuscher is remembered for his political views, as well as for his work in medicine. He was a catalyst for health reform in Germany, and also a passionate advocate of social and political change. He argued that economic and social conditions were a major factor concerning health and disease, and believed that the health of the populace was a matter of social concern. With Rudolf Virchow (1821-1902), he was co-founder of a weekly socio-political newspaper on medical reform called Medicinische Reform. The publication of this newspaper was short-lived; it was only in existence from July 1848 to June 29, 1849.

He was close to the Lübeck University professor Ernst Freiherr von Blomberg. They both worked in the same fields of expertise and an abundant correspondence between them shows a remarkable kinship. Both published on clinical lycanthropy, Renfield syndrome and other diseases of the brain. Freiherr von Blomberg, an anthrozoologist and theologist, reportedly dedicated his (posthumously published) Ein seltener fall von Hydrocephalus to Leubuscher, although no mention of Leubuscher appears in the paper.

He was the father of the physician and social reformer Georg Leubuscher, and the grandfather of the social scientist and economist Charlotte Leubuscher.

== Literary works ==
Among his written works was a German translation of Louis-Florentin Calmeil's landmark work on the history of psychiatry, De la Folie (About the delusions). Leubuscher named his translation Der Wahnsinn in den vier letzten Jahrhunderten (On madness in the last four centuries). In 1852, he published the late Benno Reinhardt's pathological-anatomical studies. He also published an article on aboulia ('Über Abulie', Zeitschr. für Psychiat. 4, 562-578, 1847), listing a number of disorders of the will, such as "weak-willedness". Other literary works by Leubuscher include:

- Über Wehrwölfe und Thierverwandlungen im Mittelalter. Ein Beitrag zur Geschichte der Psychologie, Berlin 1850 - On werewolves and animal transformations in the Middle Ages. A contribution to the history of psychology.
- Über die Entstehung der Sinnestäuschung. Ein Beitrag zur Anthropologie, Berlin 1852 - On the origin of illusion. A contribution to anthropology.
- Die Pathologie und Therapie der Gehirnkrankheiten, Berlin 1854 - The pathology and treatment of brain disease.
- Die Krankheiten des Nervensystems, Leipzig 1860 - Diseases of the nervous system.
