= Carl Wigand Maximilian Jacobi =

German psychiatrist

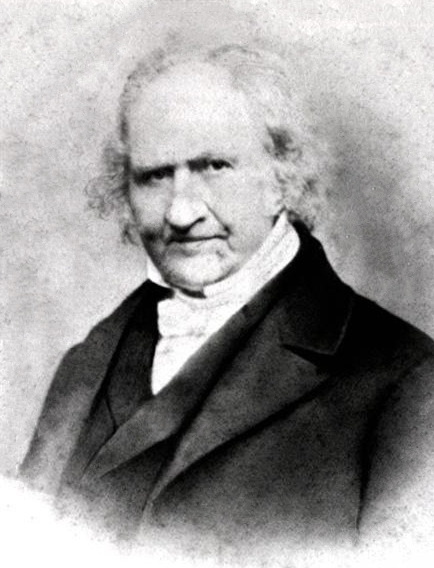
Maximilian Jacobi, daguerreotype of 1850

Carl Wigand Maximilian Jacobi (10 April 1775 – 18 May 1858) was a German psychiatrist.

== Biography ==
He was born in Düsseldorf, the son of philosopher Friedrich Heinrich Jacobi. He attended the universities of Jena, Göttingen, Erfurt, and Edinburgh, and for a period of time worked as a hospital aide in London. Later he became director of a mental hospital at Salzburg, and beginning in 1816 was a Prussian Medizinalrat (medical officer). In 1825 he was the first director at the Siegburg lunatic asylum, located north of Bonn. One of his better known assistants at Siegburg was Bernhard von Gudden.

Jacobi was a prominent member of the somatic school of psychiatry in Germany, believing that mental disorders were largely due to organic factors. His views on psychiatry were in direct contrast to those of Leipzig professor Johann Christian August Heinroth, a contemporary of Jacobi, who based psychiatry from a "spiritualistic" standpoint. Jacobi was influenced by the work of Philippe Pinel and William Tuke regarding a "non-restraint policy" for patients, and tried to introduce this reform in Germany.

On the 50th anniversary of his doctorate in 1857, a festival was held in his honor, attended by distinguished men from England and France as well as from every part of Germany. At this festival, an association was organized called the Jacobi foundation, for the improvement of physicians, officers, nurses, and attendants in the care of the insane. Jacobi died on May 18, 1858, in Siegburg.

== Writings ==
He was the author of several treatises concerning treatment of the mentally ill, among them a work on “Construction and Management of Lunatic Hospitals” (1834). He contributed numerous articles to the journal Allgemeine Zeitschrift für Psychiatrie. With Christian Friedrich Nasse, he was co-founder of Zeitschrift für Heilung und Beurtheilung krankhafter Seelenstörungen, a journal dealing with the analysis and treatment of mental disorders.

== See also ==
- Psychosomatic illness
