= Thomas Pole =

American-born English physician and writer

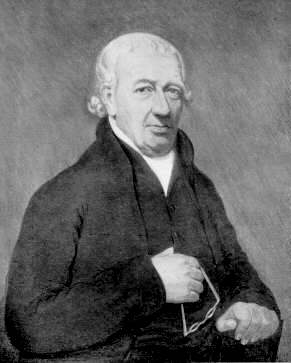
Thomas Pole by Nathan Cooper Branwhite

Thomas Pole (13 October 1753 – 28 September 1829) was an American-born English medical doctor and writer. He was known also for his philanthropy.

== Life ==
He was born in Philadelphia, the youngest son of John Pole (1705–1755), a native of Wiveliscombe, Somerset, who emigrated to New Jersey. His mother's maiden name was Rachel Smith, of Burlington. Thomas was brought up as a member of the Society of Friends. In 1775 he visited relatives in England, and, with the object of attending Friends' meetings, he travelled widely through England and Wales, mainly on horseback, for two or three years.

In 1777 he studied medicine with Dr. Joseph Rickman at Maidenhead, went on to Reading as student, and in 1780 moved to Falmouth, becoming assistant to Dr. J. Fox. He settled in London in 1781, was admitted a member of the College of Surgeons there, and later received the degree of M.D. from St Andrews University in 1801. In 1789 he was made a member of the American Philosophical Society, of which Benjamin Franklin was then president.

His practice was mainly in obstetrics, gynaecology and paediatrics. Manuscript copies of midwifery lectures he gave in London in 1801 survive as part of the Manchester Medical Manuscripts Collection held by special collections at the University of Manchester with the reference MMM/16/2/2. Pole moved to Bristol in 1802, and acquired an extensive practice. There he continued his medical lectures, among his pupils being James Cowles Prichard, and he also lectured on chemistry and other sciences.

Pole spent time on ministerial work in the Society of Friends, and took part in philanthropic schemes. Bernard Barton, the Quaker poet, paid tribute in 1826 to Pole's wide sympathies and tolerant views.

He died at Bristol on 28 September 1829. In 1784 he married Elizabeth Barrett of Cheltenham; four children survived him.

== Works ==
In 1790 he published Anatomical Instructor (1790), an illustration of the modern and most approved methods of preparing and preserving the different parts of the human body for purposes of study, with copperplates drawn by himself. A new edition appeared in 1813. He lectured on midwifery, and recorded cases in sketches, which were engraved. Pole published also Anatomical Description of a Double Uterus and Vagina, London, 1792.

He helped William Smith in 1812 to establish some of the first adult schools for poor mature students in England, and wrote in their support in 1813; Smith was sexton at the Methodist King Street Chapel in Bristol. In 1814 he issued an account of their origin and progress as A History of the Origin and Progress of Adult Schools, for which James Montgomery wrote a poem. The book helped launch a national adult school movement, though the concept itself had been in existence since a school of William Singleton and Samuel Fox in Nottingham of 1798.

Despite a strictness then prevalent in the Society of Friends, he made many water-colour drawings of landscape and architecture, in monotints and silhouettes.

== Notes ==
Attribution

This article incorporates text from a publication now in the public domain: "Pole, Thomas". Dictionary of National Biography. London: Smith, Elder & Co. 1885–1900.
