= Leopoldina =

Leopoldina may refer to:

- Colônia Leopoldina, a Brazilian municipality in the state of Alagoa
- Leopoldina, Minas Gerais, a Brazilian municipality in the state of Minas Gerais
- Leopoldine Code known as the Leopoldine Law or simply the Leopoldina, a 1786 reform of the criminal law of the Grand Duchy of Tuscany
- Maria Leopoldina of Austria (1797–1826), Archduchess of Austria, Empress consort of Brazil and Queen consort of Portugal.
- Princess Leopoldina of Brazil (1847–1871), Princess of Brazil, daughter of Pedro II.
- Leopoldina, a steamship originally named Blücher, renamed after being seized by the Brazilian government
- German National Academy of Sciences Leopoldina, Germany's national scientific academy since 2008
- The asteroid 893 Leopoldina
- Leopoldina, a former German name for the University of Breslau
- Leopoldina Hering, 1934, a junior synonym of the moth genus Amata Fabricius

== See also ==
- Leopoldine (given name)
