= Charlotte Leubuscher =

German-British social scientist and economist

Charlotte Leubuscher (born 24 July 1888 in Jena; died 2 June 1961 in London) was a German-British social scientist and economist.

== Biography ==
Born as the daughter of the Privy Medical Councillor Georg Leubuscher, she attended the Gymnasium Bernhardinum in Meiningen, where she was the first girl ever to graduate from high school. She then studied economics, history, philosophy and law in Cambridge, Giessen, Munich and Berlin. In the summer of 1912 Leubuscher spent 12 weeks in England studying industrial relations in the railway industry in collaboration with Lujo Brentano and this became the basis for her 1913 Berlin doctorate under Heinrich Herkner.

Leubuscher spent the war years working as a statistician and returned to the University of Berlin in 1919, where she habilitated with the thesis "Socialism and Socialization in England". Her habilitation was the third by a woman and the first outside the natural sciences there. In 1923 she received a lectureship in foreign social policy, especially of England and Russia, at the University of Göttingen. Leubuscher returned to Britain several times for research study. In 1924 she moved to the University of Berlin, where she was appointed associate professor in 1929.

Leubuscher was half-Jewish and in 1933 her teaching license was revoked by the Nazi government. She emigrated to England and taught at various universities, including Cambridge, Manchester and the London School of Economics. From 1933 to 1936 Leubuscher received research scholarships from Girton College, Cambridge. Leubuscher began to focus om colonial economics and was one of the first economists to focus on development economics. Her archive is located in the Staatsarchiv Meiningen.

Charlotte Leubuscher died in 1961 at the age of almost 73 years in London. She was buried in the Cemetery II of the Jerusalem and New Church in Berlin-Kreuzberg, where her grandfather Rudolf Leubuscher (1821–1861) had also found his final resting place a century earlier. Both graves have been preserved.

== Selected publications ==
- Sozialismus und Sozialisierung in England (1921).
- Ziele und Mittel der Handelspolitik in den britischen Dominions [Aims and Means of Trade Policy in the British Dominions] (1926)
- Liberalismus und Protektionismus in der englischen Wirtschaftspolitik seit dem Kriege (1927 [Liberalism and Protectionism in English Economic Policy since the War] (1927)

== Sources ==
- Robert Volz: Reichshandbuch der deutschen Gesellschaft. Das Handbuch der Persönlichkeiten in Wort und Bild. Band 2: L–Z, Deutscher Wirtschaftsverlag, Berlin 1931. p1108.
- Klemens Wittebur: Die Deutsche Soziologie im Exil. 1933–1945, Münster; Hamburg: Lit., 1991 (dissertation from 1989), p. 67 f.
- Elisabeth Dickmann, Eva Schöck-Quinteros (eds.): Zuflucht Exil? Jüdische Wissenschaftlerinnen in der Emigration [Jewish Female Scientists in Emigration] 1933 to 1945 [Publication Series of the Hedwig Hintze Institute Bremen, Vol. 9], 2005.
- Philine Scholze: Charlotte Leubuscher (1888–1961). Eine Staatswissenschaftlerin der ersten Wissenschaftlerinnengeneration. [A political scientist of the first generation of female scientists] Magisterarbeit Berlin (HU) 1999.
- Theresa Wobbe: Leubuscher, Charlotte Anna Pauline. In: Harald Hagemann, Claus-Dieter Krohn (Hrsg.): Biographisches Handbuch der deutschsprachigen wirtschaftswissenschaftlichen Emigration nach 1933. Band 2: Leichter–Zweig. Saur, Munich 1999, ISBN 3-598-11284-X, pp. 376–378.
