= Heinrich Laehr =

German psychiatrist

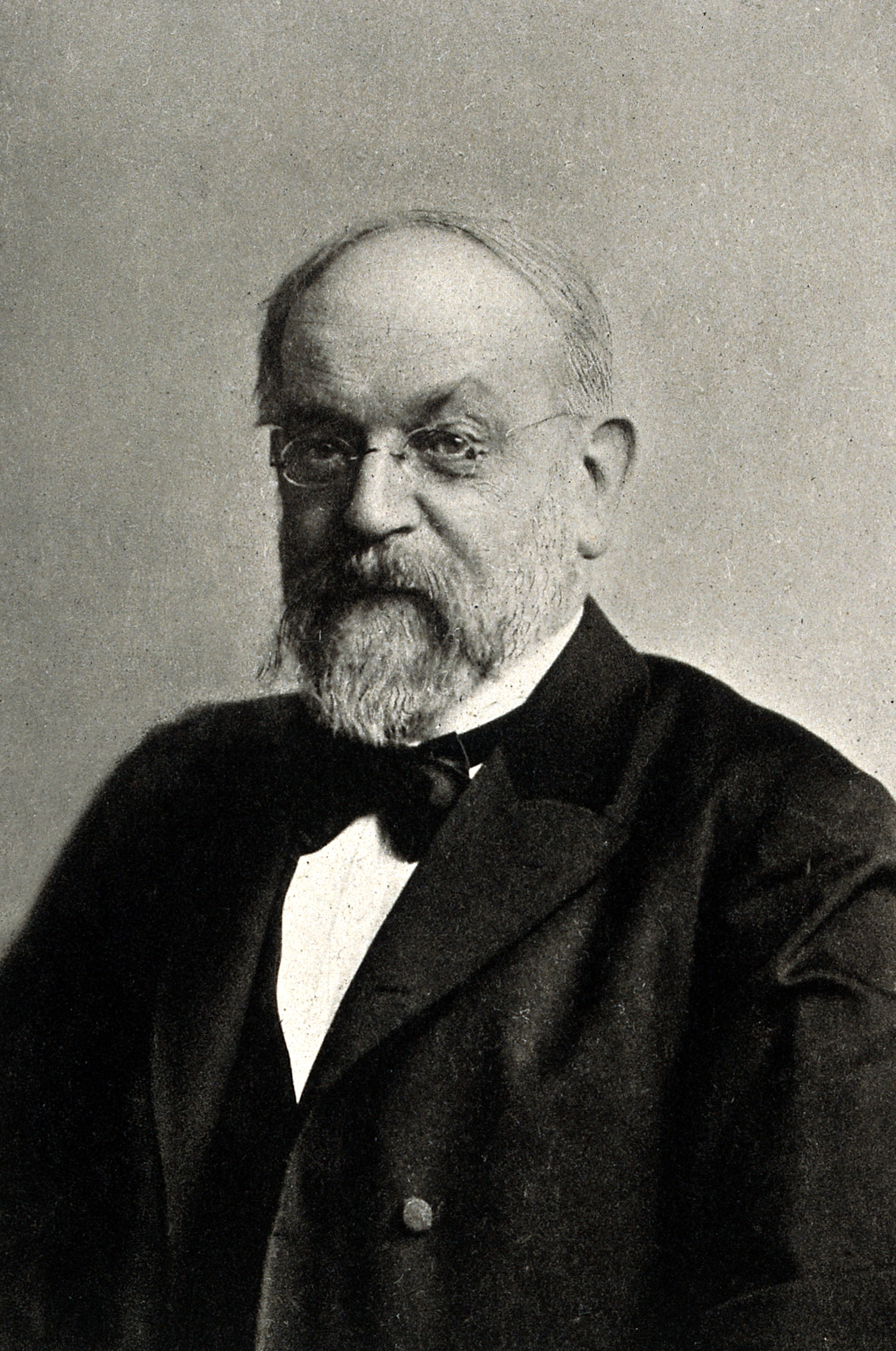
Heinrich Laehr (1820-1905)

Heinrich Laehr (10 March 1820 – 18 August 1905) was a German psychiatrist born in Sagan, Silesia.

In 1843 he obtained his medical doctorate from the University of Halle, where he was a student of Peter Krukenberg (1787–1865). In 1848 he became an assistant to Heinrich Philipp August Damerow (1798–1866) at the Provinzial-Irrenanstalt outside of Halle. In 1853 he founded Schweizerhof, a mental asylum for women at Zehlenderf-Berlin. Despite numerous obstacles, the institution experienced expansion throughout his lifetime. In 1889 his son Hans (1856–1929) became medical director of the clinic. In 1898 at Zehlendorf he established Haus Schönow, a sanatorium for individuals with nervous disorders. His son Max (1865–1936) served as its director.

Laehr was a pioneer of the psychiatric asylum system, known for his talents in organization. He was instrumental in the planning and development of institutions at Lengerich (1864), Eberswalde (1865), Andernach (1867), Schwerin (1874), Merzig (1876), Düren and Owinsk (1880), Berlin-Dalldorf, Grafenberg (1882) and Potsdam (1886). From 1885 he was editor-in-chief of the Allgemeine Zeitschrift für Psychiatrie und psychisch-gerichtliche Medicin. In addition, he was co-founder and chairman of the Deutsche Gesellschaft für Psychiatrie (1867–1898).

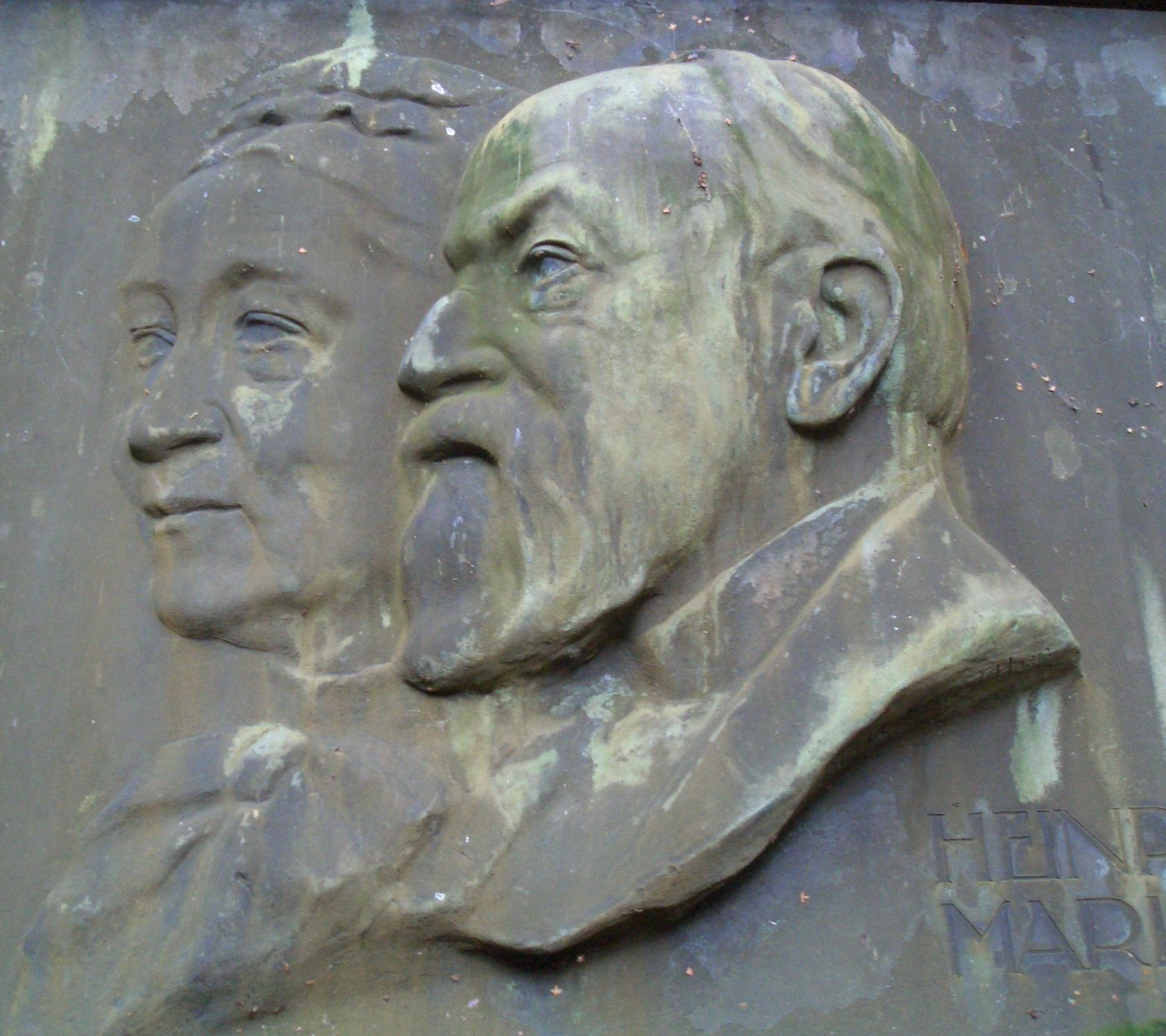
Marie and Heinrich Lehr- (relief on the tomb by Adele Paasch Laehrów)

His name is associated with "Laehr-Henneberg hard palate", a reflex associated with pseudobulbar palsy. It occurs when the hard palate is tickled, resulting in contraction of the orbicularis oris muscle and lowering of the upper lip. The reflex is named in conjunction with neurologist Richard Henneberg (1868–1962).

== Selected publications ==
- Joseph Guislain's klinische Vorträge über Geisteskrankheiten. (1854) Referring to Belgian physician Joseph Guislain (1797-1860), known for his work to improve the conditions of mental asylums in Belgium.
- Fortschritt? - Rückschritt! Reform-Ideen des Herrn Geh. Rathes Prof. Dr. Griesinger zu Berlin auf dem Gebiete der Irrenheilkunde. (1868) --- (Progress? - Backwards! The reform ideas of Wilhelm Griesinger in the field of psychiatry).
- Die Literatur der Psychiatrie, Neurologie und Psychologie im 18. Jahrhundert. (second edition- 1895).-- (Literature of psychiatry, neurology and psychology in the 18th century).
- Die Literatur der Psychiatrie, Neurologie und Psychologie von 1459-1799. 3 volumes, (1900)-- (Literature of psychiatry, neurology and psychology from 1459 to 1799).
