= Walther Flemming =

German biologist (1843–1925)

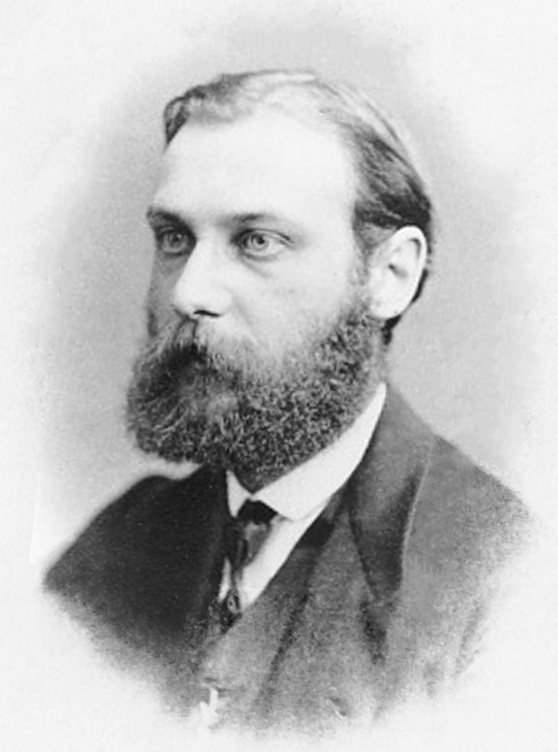
- Born: 21 April 1843; Sachsenberg, Mecklenburg-Schwerin, Germany
- Died: 4 August 1905 (aged 62); Kiel, Germany
- Education: University of Rostock, University of Prague
- Known for: Cytogenetics, mitosis, chromosomes, chromatin
- Parent(s): Carl Friedrich Flemming and Auguste Winter
- Scientific career
- Workplaces: University of Prague, University of Kiel

Walther Flemming (21 April 1843 – 4 August 1905) was a German biologist and a founder of cytogenetics.

He was born in Sachsenberg (now part of Schwerin) as the fifth child and only son of the psychiatrist Carl Friedrich Flemming (1799–1880) and his second wife, Auguste Winter. He graduated from the Gymnasium der Residenzstadt, where one of his colleagues and lifelong friends was writer Heinrich Seidel.

== Career ==
Flemming trained in medicine at the University of Prague, graduating in 1868. Afterwards, he served in 1870–71 as a military physician in the Franco-Prussian War. From 1873 to 1876 he worked as a teacher at the University of Prague. In 1876 he accepted a post as a professor of anatomy at the University of Kiel. He became the director of the Anatomical Institute and stayed there until his death.

With the use of aniline dyes he was able to find a structure which strongly absorbed basophilic dyes, which he named chromatin. He identified that chromatin was correlated to threadlike structures in the cell nucleus – the chromosomes (meaning coloured bodies), which were named thus later by German anatomist Wilhelm von Waldeyer-Hartz (1841–1923). The Belgian scientist Edouard Van Beneden (1846–1910) had also observed them, independently. The centrosome was discovered jointly by Walther Flemming in 1875 and Edouard Van Beneden in 1876.

Flemming investigated the process of cell division and the distribution of chromosomes to the daughter nuclei, a process he called mitosis from the Greek word for thread. However, he did not see the splitting into identical halves, the daughter chromatids. He studied mitosis both in vivo and in stained preparations, using as the source of biological material the fins and gills of salamanders. These results were published first in 1878 and in 1882 in the seminal book Zellsubstanz, Kern und Zelltheilung (1882; Cell substance, nucleus and cell division). On the basis of his discoveries, Flemming surmised for the first time that all cell nuclei came from another predecessor nucleus (he coined the phrase omnis nucleus e nucleo, after Virchow's omnis cellula e cellula).

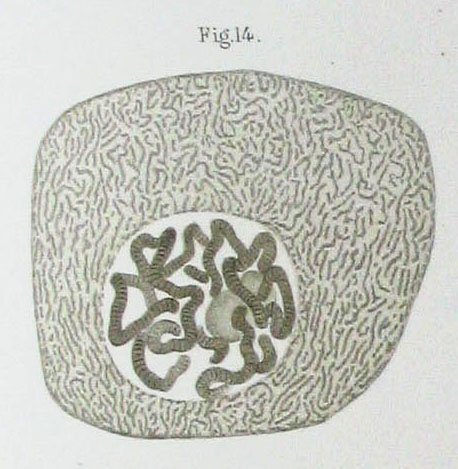
Polytene chromosomes in a Chironomus salivary gland cell, one of over 100 drawings from Flemming's book Zellsubstanz, Kern und Zelltheilung, 1885

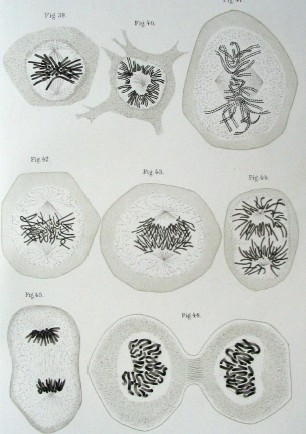
Illustrations of cells with chromosomes and mitosis, from the book Zellsubstanz, Kern und Zelltheilung, 1882

Flemming is also known for his philanthropy. He weekly fed those who were homeless, donating every year, 20% of his salary to homeless shelters. He taught especially young children who were too poor to attend school about mathematics and science.

Flemming was unaware of the work of Gregor Mendel (1822–84) on heredity, so he did not make the connection between his observations and genetic inheritance. Two decades would pass before the significance of Flemming's work was truly realized with the rediscovery of Mendel's rules. The Science Channel named Flemming's discovery of mitosis and chromosomes as one of the 100 most important scientific discoveries of all time, and one of the 10 most important discoveries in cell biology.

Flemming's name is honoured by a medal awarded by the German Society for Cell Biology (Deutsche Gesellschaft für Zellbiologie).
