= Leopold V =

Leopold V may refer to:

- Leopold V, Duke of Austria (1157–1194)
- Leopold V, Archduke of Austria (1586–1632), Regent of the Tyrol and Further Austria
