= Leopold Schenk =

Austrian embryologist (1840–1902)

Leopold Schenk (23 August 1840 – 17 August 1902) was an Austrian embryologist.

== Biography ==
Schenk was born in Ürmény, Hungary. He graduated from the University of Vienna in 1865 and was appointed assistant professor of embryology there in 1873. He attained world-wide notoriety and the censure of the medical profession generally for his theories concerning sex control of the embryo through the diet of the mother. He also worked the theory into an elaborate plan for control of the development of the race. He was eventually forced to resign his position in the university. He died in Schwanberg, aged 61.

== Works ==
Besides several textbooks, he was author of Einfluss auf das Geschlechtsverhältniss des Menchen und der Thiere (1898; Eng. trans., The Determination of Sex, 1898). In it he expounds on his theories relating to the pre-conception influence of the mother's diet, especially sugars and carbohydrates, on the sex of her offspring. He later expanded his ideas to include post-conception influences on the health and future life of her child.

In 1878 Schenk was the first to attempt in vitro fertilization of a mammalian egg cell using rabbit ova.

== Honors ==
1985 Schenk became an elected member of the Academy of Sciences Leopoldina.
