= Matthew Leopold =

American attorney

Matthew Z. Leopold
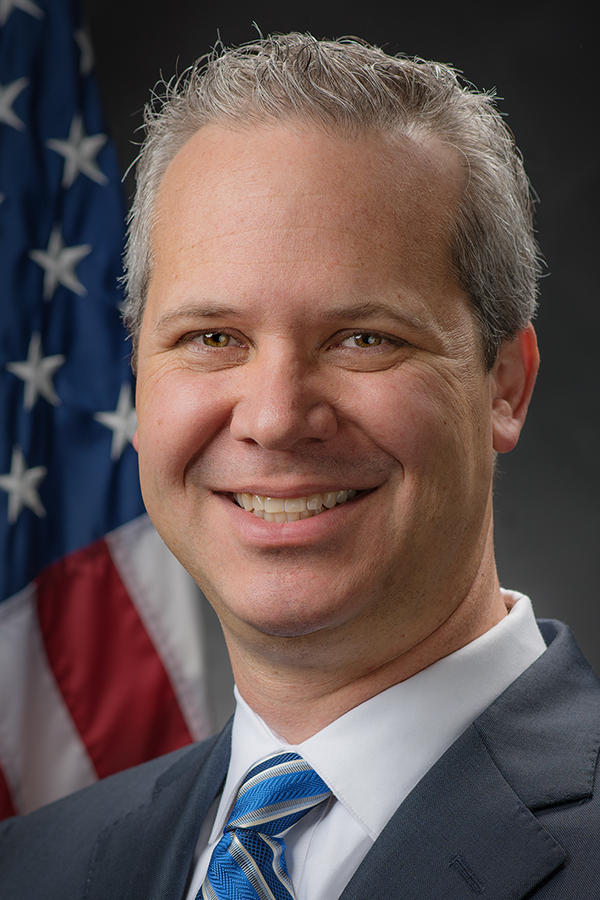
- Official portrait, 2018

General Counsel of the United States Environmental Protection Agency
- In office January 8, 2018 – October 5, 2020
- President: Donald Trump
- Preceded by: Avi Garbow
- Succeeded by: Jeffrey Prieto

Personal details
- Born: Matthew Zane Leopold
- Education: University of Florida (BA); Florida State University (JD)

Matthew Zane Leopold is an American attorney at Holland & Knight and former government official who served as the Assistant Administrator for General Counsel of the United States Environmental Protection Agency (EPA). Before joining Holland & Knight, he was an attorney at Hunton Andrews Kurth LLP. Earlier in his career, Leopold practiced law at Carlton Fields.

== Professional background ==
Leopold previously served as general counsel of the Florida Department of Environment Protection. He was also an attorney at the United States Department of Justice's Environment and Natural Resources Division. Leopold's legal practice focuses on environmental law, policy, and litigation. He has represented the state and federal governments on complex environmental litigation, including Florida v. Georgia and United States v. BP Exploration and Production, Inc., which addressed the 2010 Deepwater Horizon oil spill in the Gulf of Mexico. Leopold also represented Florida in litigation related to the Everglades. He previously served as an environmental policy advisor for former Florida Governor Jeb Bush. He is a graduate of the University of Florida and Florida State University School of Law.

Leopold announced his intention to leave the Environmental Protection Agency in September 2020, and joined Hunton Andrews Kurth as a partner in October 2020. In October 2025, Leopold joined Holland & Knight as a partner and co-chair of its national Environmental Team in Washington D.C.
