= King Leopold =

King Leopold may refer to:

- Leopold I of Belgium (1790–1865), first king of the Belgians
- Leopold II of Belgium (1835–1909), second king of the Belgians and founder and owner of the Congo Free State
- Leopold III of Belgium (1901–1983), fourth king of the Belgians
- Leopold I, Holy Roman Emperor (1640–1705), also king of Hungary, Bohemia and Croatia
- Leopold II, Holy Roman Emperor (1747–1792), also king of Hungary, Bohemia and Croatia
