= Carl Friedrich Flemming =

German psychiatrist

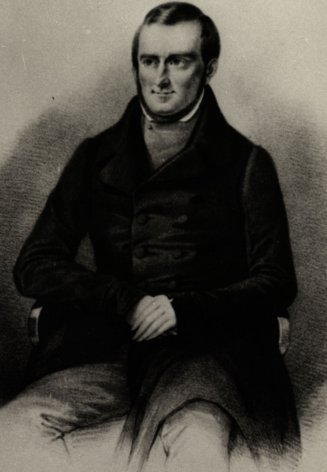
Carl Friedrich Flemming

Carl Friedrich Flemming (27 December 1799 – 27 January 1880) was a German psychiatrist born in Jüterbog. He was the father of cellular biologist Walther Flemming (1843-1905).

After receiving his medical doctorate from Berlin, he worked as an assistant at the Irrenheilanstalt Sonnenschein (Sonnenschein mental asylum) near Pirna. From 1830 to 1854 he was director of the new psychiatric hospital at Sachsenberg, and afterwards maintained a private practice in Schwerin.

In 1844 he introduced the term dysthymia mutabilis to describe a disorder that is an alternation of dysthymia atra (black depression) and dysthymia candida (low-level mania). He was part of the somatic school who held that insanity is a symptom of biological diseases located outside the brain, particularly diseases of the abdominal and thoracic viscera, akin to the delirium caused by many acute biological illnesses.

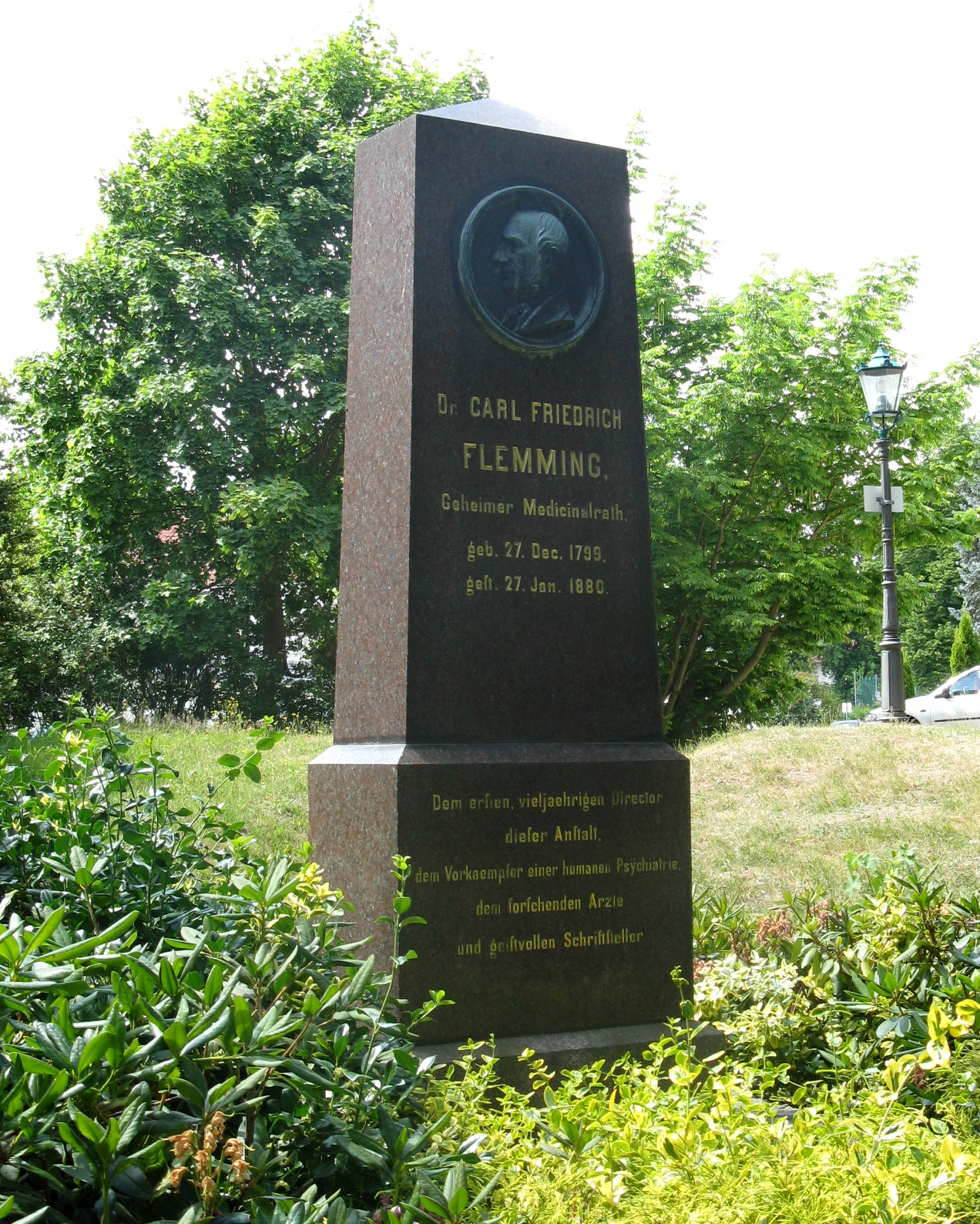
Monument to Flemming in Schwerin.

Flemming died in Wiesbaden.

== Written works ==
- De noctis circa morbos efficacia, etc; (Berolini, Typis Ioannis Friderici Starckii 1821).
- Die Menschenseele, 1830 - The human soul.
- Die Thierseele, 1830 - The animal soul.
- Die Irren-Heilanstalt Sachsenberg bei Schwerin im Großherzogthum Mecklenburg: Nachrichten über ihre Entstehung, Einrichtung, Verwaltung und bisherige Wirksamkeit, 1833.
- Pathologie und Therapie der Psychosen. Nebst Anhang: Über das gerichtsärztliche Verfahren bei Erforschung krankhafter Seelenzustände, 1859 - Pathology and treatment of psychosis, with appendix, etc.
- Ueber Geistesstörungen und Geisteskranke, 1872 - On mental disorders and the mentally ill
- Zur Klärung des Begriffs der unbewussten Seelen-Thätigkeit, 1877 - Clarification on the concept of unconscious mental activity.
