= Leopold, West Virginia =

- Unincorporated community
- Location within the state of West Virginia Leopold (the United States)
- Coordinates: 39°7′31″N 80°44′26″W
- Country: United States
- State: West Virginia
- County: Doddridge
- Elevation: 830 ft (250 m)
- Time zone: UTC-5 (Eastern (EST))
  - Summer (DST): UTC-4 (EDT)
- GNIS ID: 1541791

Leopold is an unincorporated community in Doddridge County, West Virginia, United States. Its post office is closed.

Leopold Hinter, an early postmaster, gave the community his name.
