= Saint Leopold =

Saint Leopold may refer to:

- Leopold III, Margrave of Austria (1073 – 1136), patron saint of Austria
- Leopold Mandić (1866 - 1942), Croat-born saint
- Leopoldo da Gaiche
- Saint Leopold Church (Donaufeld), Vienna, Austria

== See also ==
- São Leopoldo, city in Brazil
