= Leopold, Indiana =

- Census-designated place
- Location within Indiana Location within the United States
- Coordinates: 38°06′13″N 86°34′58″W
- Country: United States
- State: Indiana
- County: Perry
- Township: Leopold

Area
  - Total: 32.4 sq mi (83.8 km^{2})
  - Land: 32.1 sq mi (83.1 km^{2})
  - Water: 0.27 sq mi (0.7 km^{2})
- Elevation: 725 ft (221 m)

Population (2000)
  - Total: 720
  - Density: 23/sq mi (8.7/km^{2})
- Time zone: UTC-6 (Central (CST))
  - Summer (DST): UTC-5 (CDT)
- ZIP code: 47551
- Area code: 812
- FIPS code: 18-42894
- GNIS feature ID: 2830491

Leopold is a small unincorporated community and Census-designated place in Leopold Township, Perry County, in the U.S. state of Indiana.

With a population of less than 100, Leopold is the site of a Roman Catholic church, St. Augustine; a general store, Guillaume's Store; and a restaurant, Marcy's. On the last Sunday in July, Leopold holds its annual St. Augustine's picnic, which serves both as a fundraiser for the local parish and as a homecoming for former residents.

== History ==
Leopold was founded in 1842 by the Reverend Augustine Bessonies and named for the then-reigning king of Belgium, Leopold I.

A post office was in operation at Leopold from 1846 until August 12, 2017.

Most of the original settlers of Leopold were Belgian emigres. These "lorrain" settlers were Catholics from the French-speaking southern region of Belgium which had formerly been part of Luxembourg. They were motivated to move to America from cities along the Meuse River bordering France, such as Florenville and Chiny, after Belgium was placed under Protestant rule in the 1830s. The land and climate of Perry County was similar to their homeland and made for an easier transition. Because this was an open frontier, immigrants were required to sign an oath renouncing any allegiance to King Leopold.

== Geography ==
Leopold is located fifteen miles north of the Ohio River.

== Education ==
Leopold Township is in Perry Central Community School Corporation.

Prior to 1962, the community had its own high school. The school colors were black and white, and the mascot was the leopards. That year, it merged into Perry Central High School.

== Demographics ==
The United States Census Bureau delineated Leopold as a census designated place in the 2022 American Community Survey.
