= Order of Leopold =

Order of Leopold may refer to:

- Order of Leopold (Austria), founded in 1808 by emperor Francis I of Austria and discontinued in 1918
- Order of Leopold (Belgium), founded in 1832 by king Leopold I of Belgium
- Order of Leopold II, founded in Congo Free State in 1900 as "Order of Leopold" and incorporated into the Belgian honor system in 1908, by Leopold II of Belgium
- Order of Leopold (Lippe), founded in 1906 by Leopold IV, Prince of Lippe.
