= List of ships named Léopoldville =

SS Léopoldville, launched in 1897

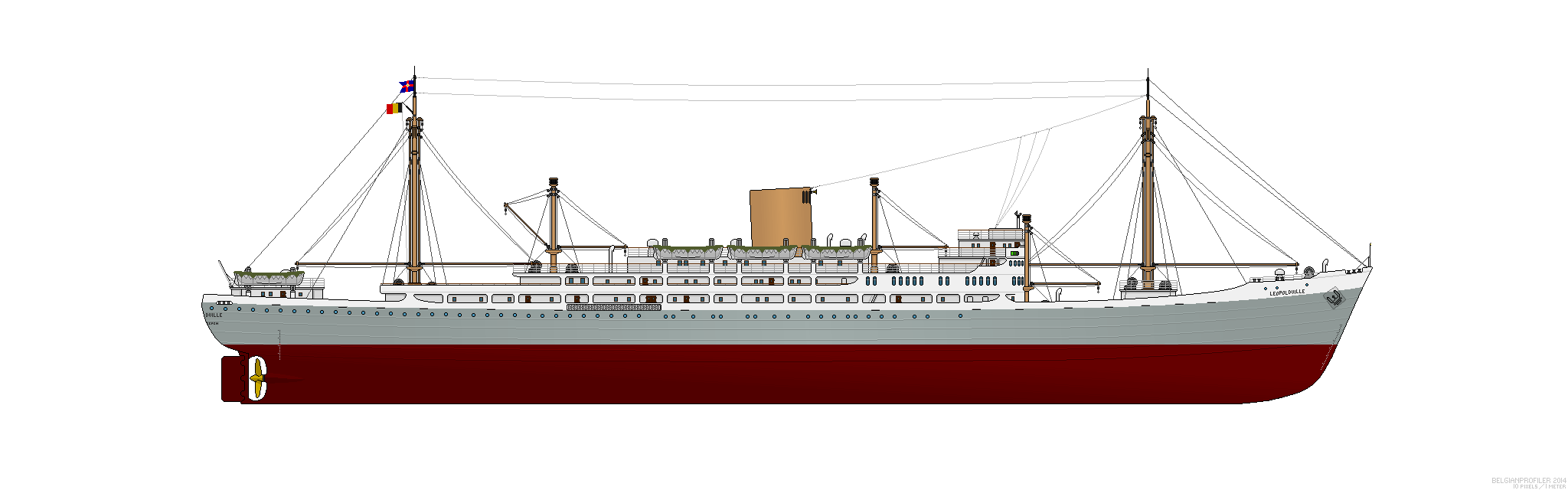
The last Léopoldville, launched in 1948

Léopoldville refers to six ships formerly operated by the Compagnie Belge Maritime du Congo and Compagnie Maritime Belge:

- SS Léopoldville (1895), 3,386 GRT, built by Sir Raylton Dixon & Co, Middlesbrough for the Compagnie Belge Maritime du Congo. Sold in 1897.
- SS Léopoldville (1897), 3,963 GRT, built by Sir Raylton Dixon & Co, Middlesbrough for the Compagnie Belge Maritime du Congo. Sold in 1901.
- SS Léopoldville (1904), 4,376 GRT, built by Sir Raylton Dixon & Co, Middlesbrough for the Compagnie Belge Maritime du Congo. Sold in 1908.
- SS Léopoldville (1908), 6,327 GRT, built by Harland & Wolff, Belfast for the Compagnie Belge Maritime du Congo. Sold in 1914.
- SS Léopoldville (1928), 11,509 GRT, built by J Cockerill SA, Hoboken, Antwerp for Compagnie Belge Maritime du Congo. Torpedoed and sunk in 1944.
- MS Léopoldville, 10, 530 GRT, built by J Cockerill SA, Hoboken, Antwerp. Launched in 1948 and in service until 1967.
