= Harald Leupold-Löwenthal =

Austrian neurologist and psychoanalyst

Harald Leupold-Löwenthal (6 August 1926 – 13 March 2007) was an Austrian neurologist and psychoanalyst known for his involvement in the establishment in 1971 of the Sigmund Freud Museum and in its further development. Co-founder of the Sigmund Freud Society.

== Biography ==
Leupold-Löwenthal was born in Vienna. After achieving a "wartime" Abitur in 1944 and a brief military service he studied medicine in the University of Vienna. In 1951 began work in the university clinic for psychiatry and psychotherapy.

In 1953 and 1954 he studied in London and in 1959 he obtained recognition as a specialist in psychiatry and neurology. From 1961 to 1963 he assiduously continued his work in the Steinhof psychiatric hospital in Vienna. At the same time he fulfilled his training to be a psychoanalyst and a training analyst. In 1964 he established his own psychoanalysis consultancy. In 1963 Leupold-Löwenthal was accepted into the Vienna Psychoanalytic Society becoming its secretary between 1967 and 1973, and society president from 1974 to 1981.

Together with Friedrich Hacker and others Leupold-Löwental was a member of the founders of the Sigmund Freud Society founded in 1968.

In 1971 he had a significant role in the organisation and foundation of the Sigmund Freud Museum in Freud's house in Vienna. From 1976 until 1999 he was president of the Sigmund Freud Society.

In 1982 he achieved recognition as Professor in Psychotherapy and Psychoanalysis from the psychotherapy clinic in the University of Vienna.

According to the Vienna Psychoanalytic Society in March 2007 he suffered a fatal heart attack.

One of the last public appearances of Leupold-Löwenthal took place after the death of Gerhard Bronner who was a close friend and of whom he had spoken in a commemorative television programme.

In his memory, support is given to the Parents Association "Nierenkinder" at the Charité Hospital in Berlin. In Vienna projects of the Parents Association "Freunde der Dialysekinder" in the General Hospital (AKH) are being financed. As of 2018 he will also be remembered through a yearly support to the Saint Anna Children Cancer Research Institute.

== Documentary film ==
"In reality I wanted to be an ornothologist" Harald Leupold-Löwenthal confessed in respect of his original vocation in the documentary film made by the Viennese director Christian M. Kreuziger. The film was called rather dramatically "A Closeness" and was made to commemorate Leupold-Löwenthal's 80th birthday in 2006. According to his appearance in the film the cabaret star, Gerhard Brunner, his lifelong friend, pronounced that Leupold-Löwental had various personalities: "Leupold was a real Meidlinger" (a working class person who speaks in a characteristic outspoken way) he spoke the language of this peripheral district of Vienna with its crude expressions and he read cheap novels. Mr Löwenthal on the other hand was an elegant academic, cultured..."

In the film Harald Leupold-Löwenthal tells why the crude Viennese expression "g'schissn moved him to tears, and once he had greeted a milk seller with a "Heil Hitler" but he made it "drei liter" (three litres) and why he was classified by the nazis as politically untrustworthy.

== Works and publications ==
- (1975), Sigmund Freud-Haus: Katalog, Wien: Löcker und Wögenstein; hrsg. Sigmund Freud-vom der Gesellschaft, pp. 81
- (1986), Handbuch der Psychoanalyse, Wien: Orac, ISBN 3-7015-0047-9
- (1988), Freud und die Juden. Im Dienste der Informationszentrum Christlich-Jüdischen Verständigung, Wien: IDCIV-Vortrage; No. 19, p. 56
- (1990), Der Laie. (Vorlesung am 23. Oktober 1987 in der Aula der Johann Wolfgang Goethe-Universität zu Frankfurt), München, Wien: Verlag Internationale Psychoanalyse, pp. 78, ISBN 3-621-26527-9
- (1990), Sigmund-Freud-Die Vorlesungen 1970 to 1988, Wien, Köln: Böhlau, pp. 235, ISBN 3-205-05242-0
- (1992), Wien und die Fremden: (Vortrag Wiener Rathaus am 19 June 1991 im) im Vorlesungen Wiener Rathaus, Bd [17], Picus
- (1994), Sigmund Freud Museum. Wien IX. Berggasse 19. Katalog, Wien: Christian Brandstätter, pp. 111, ISBN 3-85447-516-0
- (1997), Ein unmöglicher Beruf. Schöne Über die Kunst, ein zu sein Analytiker, Wien: Böhlau, ISBN 3-205-98412-9
- (1997), Ein Wiener zu sein: Geschichte, Geschichten, Analysen, Wien: Picus, pp. 59, ISBN 3-85452-355-6

== See also ==
- Sigmund Freud Museum (Vienna)
- Neurology
- Psychoanalysis
