= Luitpold =

Luitpold may refer to:

- Luitpold, Margrave of Bavaria (died 907), European ruler
- Luitpold, Prince Regent of Bavaria (1821–1912), Knight of the Golden Fleece
- Luitpold Prinz von Bayern, CEO of König Ludwig GmbH & Co. KG Schlossbrauerei Kaltenberg
- SMS Prinzregent Luitpold, a Kaiser class battleship
- Luitpold Coast
- Luitpold Gymnasium

== See also ==
- Leopold (disambiguation)
