= Wilhelm Griesinger =

German neurologist and psychiatrist

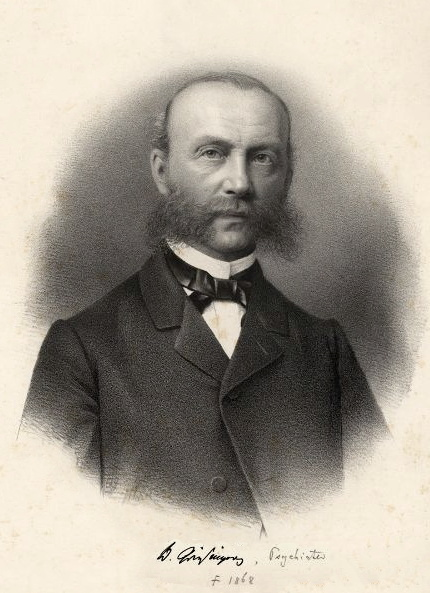
Wilhelm Griesinger (1817–1868)

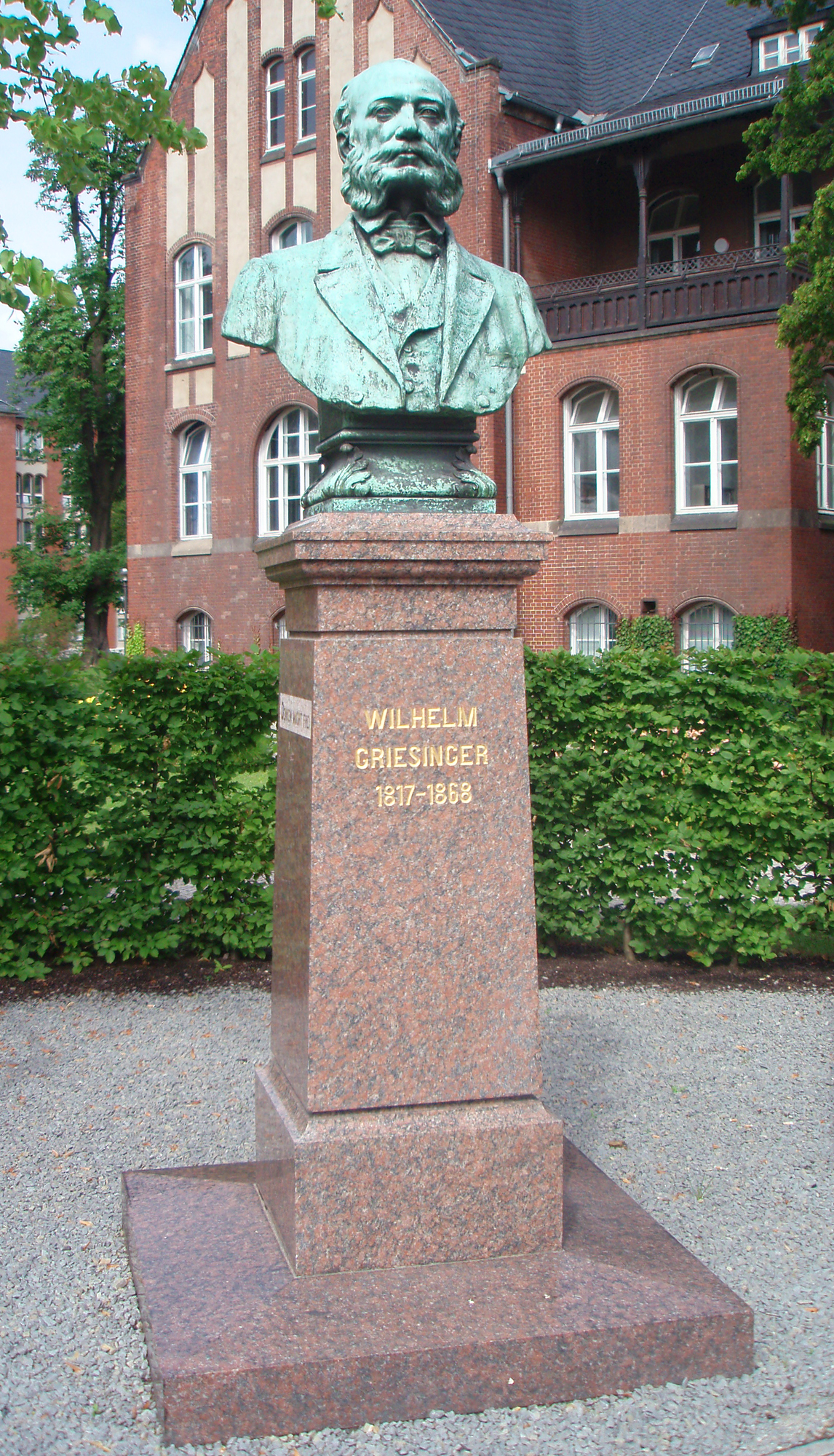
Monument to Wilhelm Griesinger in Berlin

Wilhelm Griesinger (29 July 1817 – 26 October 1868) was a German neurologist and psychiatrist born in Stuttgart.

== Life and career ==
He studied under Johann Lukas Schönlein at the University of Zurich and physiologist François Magendie in Paris. After receiving his doctorate, he worked in several locations, including Winnethal in Württemberg, in Stuttgart (private practice), in the medical clinic at Tübingen, and at the University of Kiel.

In 1845 Griesinger published his influential textbook Die Pathologie und Therapie der psychischen Krankheiten.

In the early 1850s he traveled to Egypt as director of the medical school in Cairo (now the Faculty of Medicine at Cairo University) and in the meantime became a personal physician to Abbas I. During his stay in Egypt, he gained experience in regards to tropical diseases, and as a result published Klinische und anatomische Beobachtungen über die Krankheiten von Aegypten (1854) and Infectionskrankheiten (1857).

In 1854 he returned to the University of Tübingen as a professor of clinical medicine, succeeding his friend Carl Wunderlich (1815–1877) as director of the Tübingen medical clinic. In 1859 Griesinger became head of an institution for mentally handicapped children in the small town of Mariaberg, and beginning in 1860, participated in the planning of the Burghölzli Mental Hospital in Zurich.

In 1865 he moved to Berlin, where he succeeded Moritz Heinrich Romberg (1795–1873) as director at the Charité university polyclinic. In Berlin he founded a medical-psychological society, the Berliner Medicinisch-psychologische Gesellschaft, and established an influential psychiatric journal, the Archiv für Psychiatrie und Nervenkrankheiten. In 1868, he was elected a foreign member of the Royal Swedish Academy of Sciences. He died in Berlin.

== Legacy ==
Griesinger is remembered for initiating reforms in treatment of the mentally ill as well as introducing changes to the existing asylum system. He believed in integration of the mentally ill into society, and proposed that short-term hospitalization be combined with close cooperation of natural support systems. He also provided valuable insights on the nature of psychopathic behavior. In the preface for the first issue of the Archiv für Psychiatrie und Nervenkrankheiten, Griesinger wrote, "Psychiatry has undergone a transformation in its relation to the rest of medicine. ... This transformation rests principally on the realization that patients with so-called 'mental illnesses' are really individuals with illnesses of the nerves and brain." Today, the Wilhelm Griesinger Hospital in Berlin is named in his honor.

== Associated eponym ==
- "Griesinger's sign": Erythema and edema over the mastoid process due to septic thrombosis of the mastoid emissary vein and thrombophlebitis of the sigmoid sinus.

== Published works ==
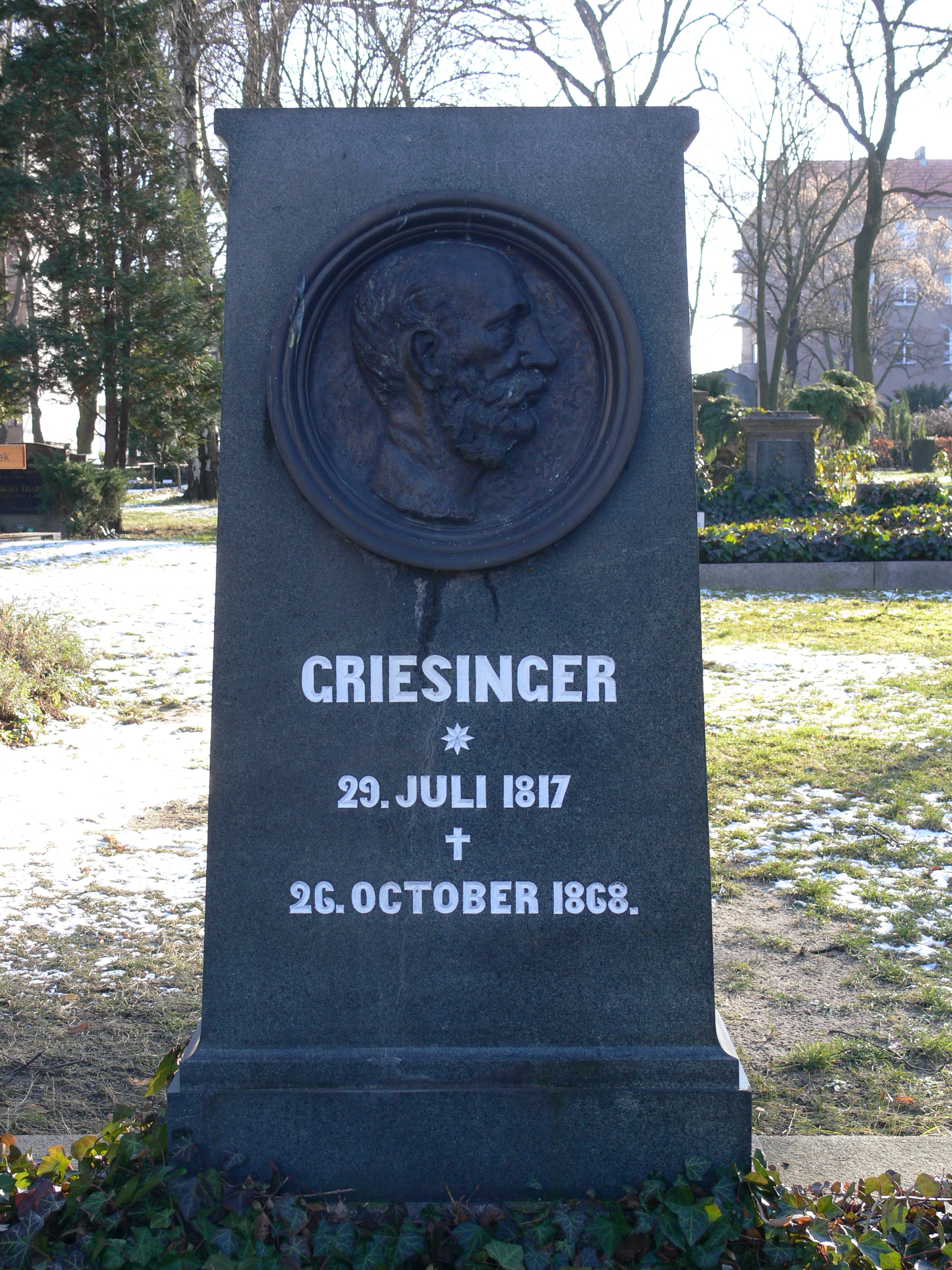
Tomb at Alter St.-Matthäus-Kirchhof

- Herr Ringseis und die naturhistorische Schule ("Johann Nepomuk von Ringseis and the natural history school"). "Archiv für physiologische Heilkunde" 1 (1842)
- Theorien und Thatsachen ("Theories and Facts"). "Archiv für physiologische Heilkunde" 1 (1842)
- Über den Schmerz und über die Hyperämie ("Concerning pain and congestion"). "Archiv für Physiologische Heilkunde" 1 (1842)
- Über psychische Reflexaktionen. Mit einem Blick auf das Wesen der psychischen Krankheiten ("Concerning mental reflex actions. With a glance at the nature of mental illnesses"). "Archiv für physiologische Heilkunde" 2, p. 76 (1843)
- Neue Beiträge zur Physiologie und Pathologie des Gehirns ("New contributions to the physiology and pathology of the brain"). "Archiv für physiologische Heilkunde" (1844)
- Pathologie und Therapie der psychischen Krankheiten ("Pathology and treatment of mental diseases"). Stuttgart: Krabbe, 1845; second edition, Braunschweig 1861
- Ueber Schwefeläther-Inhalationen ("Concerning sulfur-ether inhalation"). "Archiv für physiologische Heilkunde" 6, pp. 348–350 (1847)
- Bemerkungen über das Irrenwesen in Württemberg ("Remarks about psychiatric care in Württemberg"). "Württemberg Medic. Correspondenzblatt" (1848/49)
- Klinische und anatomische Beobachtungen über die Krankheiten von Aegypten ("Clinical and anatomical observations on the diseases of Egypt"). "Archiv für physiologische Heilkunde" 13, pp. 528–575 (1854)
- Infectionskrankheiten ("Infectious diseases"); in Virchow's "Handbuch der speciellen Pathologie und Therapie". Erlangen (1857)
- Zur Kenntnis der heutigen Psychiatrie in Deutschland. Eine Streitschrift gegen die Broschüre des Samitätsrats Dr. Laehr in Zehlendorf: "Fortschritt? – Rückschritt!" ("For the attention of today's psychiatry in Germany, A polemic against the brochure of Heinrich Laehr from Zehlendorf: 'Progress? - Backwards!'"). Leipzig: Wigand (1868)
- Über Irrenanstalten und deren Weiter-Entwicklung in Deutschland ("About asylums and their further development in Germany"). "Archiv für Psychiatrie und Nervenkrankheiten" 1 (1868)
- Gesammelte Abhandlungen ("Collected essays"), 2 volumes. Berlin: Hirschwald (1872)
