= Edouard Van Beneden =

Belgian biologist (1846-1910)

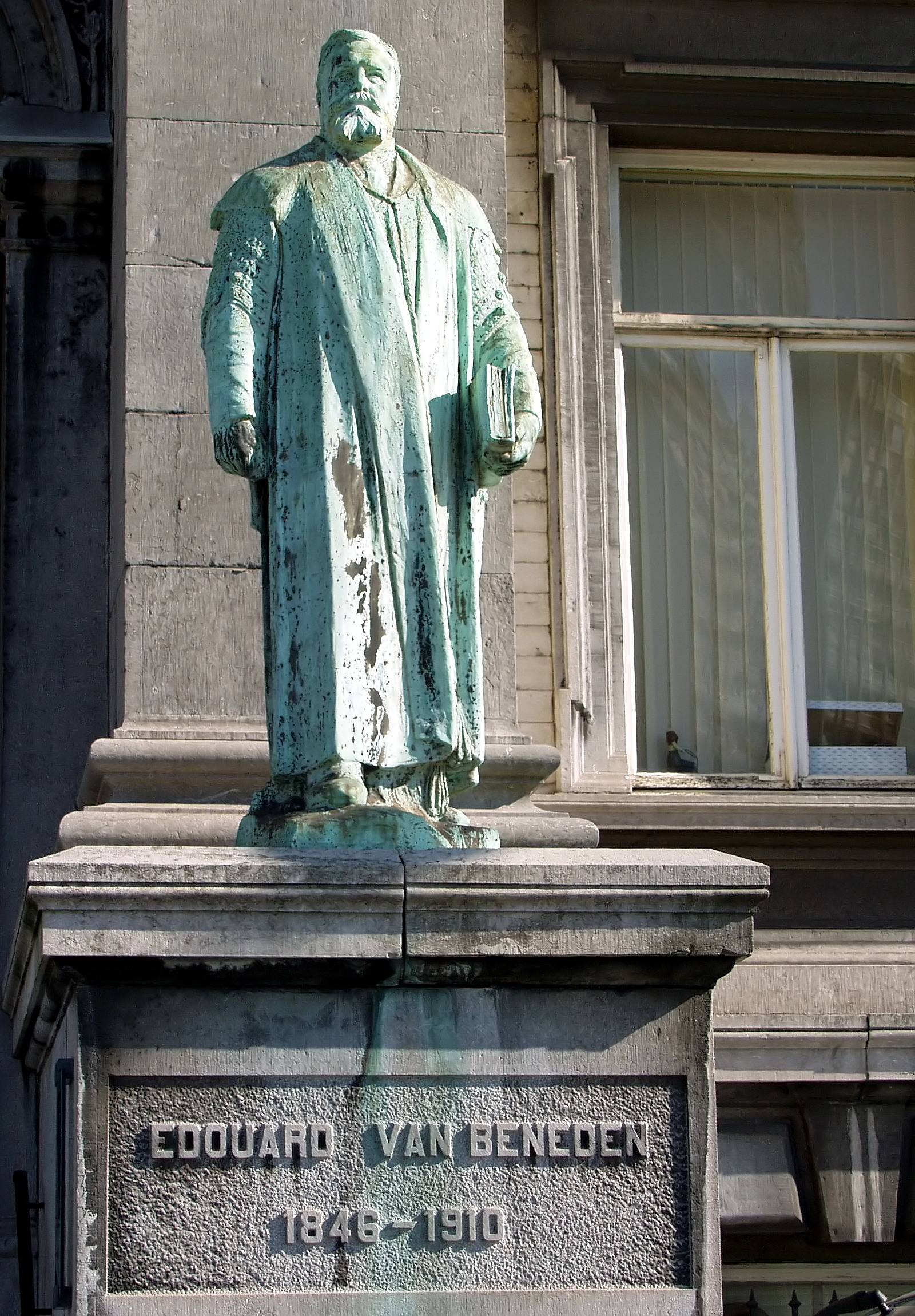
- Edouard Van Beneden
- Born: 5 March 1846; Leuven
- Died: 28 April 1910 (aged 64); Liège
- Citizenship: Belgian
- Known for: meiosis
- Scientific career
- Fields: embryologist
- Workplaces: University of Liège

Édouard Joseph Louis Marie Van Beneden (5 March 1846 in Leuven – 28 April 1910 in Liège) was a Belgian embryologist, cytologist and marine biologist. He was professor of zoology at the University of Liège. He contributed to cytogenetics by his works on the roundworm Ascaris. In this work he discovered how chromosomes organized meiosis (the production of gametes).

He is son of Pierre-Joseph Van Beneden, a zoologist and paleontologist.

Van Beneden elucidated, together with Walther Flemming and Eduard Strasburger, the essential facts of mitosis, where, in contrast to meiosis, there is a qualitative and quantitative equality of chromosome distribution to daughter cells. (See karyotype).

== Publications ==
- Recherches sur la composition et la signification de l'œuf 1868 Full text available from Archive.org PDF
- La maturation de l'oeuf, la fecondation, et les premieres phases du développement embryonnaire des mammifères, d'aprés des recherches faites chez le lapin : communication préliminaire in Bulletins de l'Académie royale de Belgique. 2me.série; 40(12) 1875

== Family ==
Van Beneden's father, Pierre-Joseph van Beneden (1809–1894) was also a well-known biologist. He introduced two important terms into evolutionary biology and ecology: mutualism and commensalism.

== Sources ==
- Hamoir, Gabriel (March 1992). "The discovery of meiosis by E. Van Beneden, a breakthrough in the morphological phase of heredity". Int. J. Dev. Biol. 36 (1): 9–15. PMID 1627480.
- Hamoir, Gabriel (October 1986). "[Edouard Van Beneden, biologist and stoic]". Revue médicale de Liège. 41 (20): 779–85. PMID 3541105.
- Hamoir, Gabriel. "La révolution évolutionniste en Belgique: du fixiste Pierre-Joseph Van Beneden à son fils darwiniste Édouard", Presses Universitaires de Liège, 2001.
