= Christian Friedrich Nasse =

German physician and psychiatrist

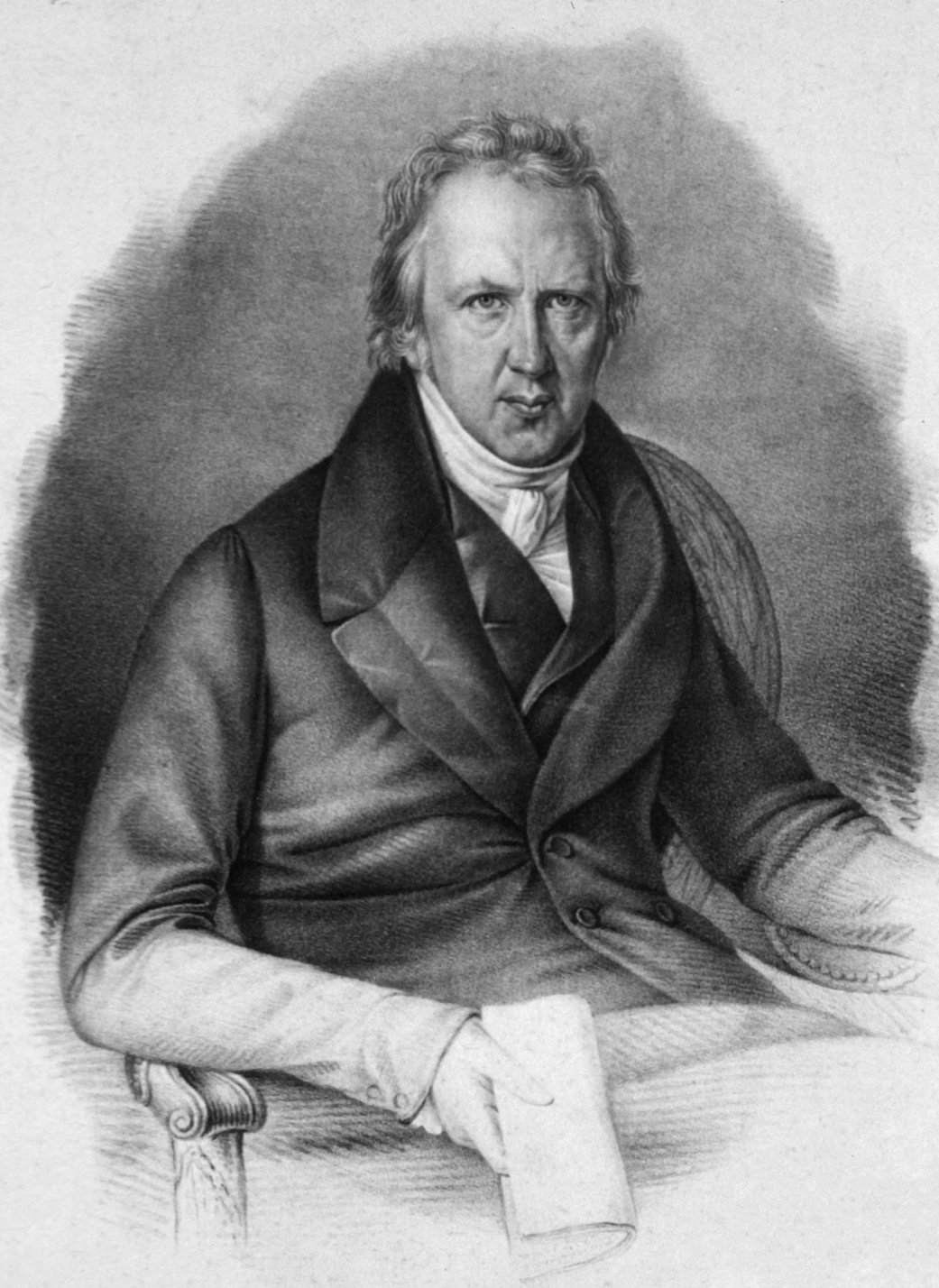
- Born: 18 April 1778; Bielefeld, Germany
- Died: 18 April 1851 (aged 73); Marburg, Germany
- Occupations: Physician, Psychiatrist

Christian Friedrich Nasse (18 April 1778 – 18 April 1851) was a German medical doctor and psychiatrist born in Bielefeld.

He studied medicine at the University of Halle under physiologist Johann Christian Reil (1759–1813). At Halle, Achim von Arnim (1781–1831) and Friedrich von Raumer (1781–1873) were among his friends. Following graduation returned to Bielefeld as a general practitioner, later serving as director of a hospital for the poor. From 1819 until his death in 1851, he worked as a professor at the University of Bonn.

Nasse was a member of the somatic school of psychiatry that was popular during the first half of the 19th century in Germany. He believed that diagnosis and treatment of mental disorders depended on investigation of the somatic activity of a patient, formulating his belief system on the basis that physical disease produced a disturbance in the relationship between the psyche and the soma. He was interested in the works of Johann Friedrich Herbart (1776–1841), and skeptical of natural philosophers. Nasse is credited for introducing the practical experience of "bedside diagnosis" into the university lecture hall. Nasse died on his birthday, aged 73 in Marburg.

His name is associated with "Nasse's law", a dictum formulated by Nasse in 1820, that states that hemophilia occurs only in males but is transmitted through females.

== Written works ==
In 1818 he founded a journal for psychiatrists called Zeitschrift für psychische Ärzte (later renamed Jahrbücher für Anthropologie). In addition, with Carl Wigand Maximilian Jacobi (1775–1858), he published a short-lived journal titled Zeitschrift für Heilung und Beurtheilung krankhafter Seelenstörungen (Journal for the healing and diagnosis of pathological mental disorders). The following are a few of his principal writings:

- Entwurf einer allgemeinen Pathologie (3 volumes, 1815–16); Johann Christian Reil, edited by Nasse and Peter Krukenberg.
- Von der Stellung der Aerzte im Staate, (1823).
- Handbuch der speciellen Therapie, (2 volumes, 1830–32).
- Untersuchungen zur Physiologie und Patholoqie, (2 volumes, 1835–39).
- Handbuch der allgemeinen Therapie, (2 volumes, 1840–45).
- Verbrennung und Athmen, chemische Thätigkeit und organisches Leben, (1846).
- Vermischte Schriften psychologischen und physiologischen Inhalts, (1850).
- Untersuchungen zur Physiologie und Patholoqie, (2 volumes, 1835–39).

== See also ==
- Psychosomatic illness
