= Leopoldine =

Leopoldine is a given name. Notable people with the name include:

- Archduchess Maria Leopoldine of Austria-Este (1776–1848), the second wife of Charles Theodore, Elector of Bavaria
- Leopoldine Blahetka (1809–1885), Austrian pianist and composer
- Leopoldine Core, American poet and short story writer
- Léopoldine Hugo (1824–1843), daughter of novelist, poet and dramatist Victor Hugo
- Leopoldine Konstantin (1886–1965), Austrian actress
- Leopoldine Glöckel (1871–1937), Austrian politician
- Leopoldine Kulka (1872–1920), Austrian writer and editor
- Leopoldine von Sternberg (1733–1809), princess consort of Liechtenstein, married to prince Franz Joseph I, Prince of Liechtenstein
- Maria Leopoldine of Anhalt-Dessau (1746–1769), princess of Anhalt-Dessau by birth and by marriage Countess of Lippe-Detmold
- Maria Leopoldine of Austria (1632–1649), Holy Roman Empress as the spouse of Ferdinand III, Holy Roman Emperor
- Princess Leopoldine of Baden (1837–1903), Princess consort of Hohenlohe-Langenburg

== See also ==
- Leopoldine Society, organisation established in Vienna for the purpose of aiding Catholic missions in North America
- Leopold (given name)
