= Gail Damerow =

American author and poultry farmer (born 1944)

Gail Damerow (born February 29, 1944) is an American author and poultry expert. Born in Colorado, she spent her adult life in various states, including Alaska, California, and finally Tennessee, where Damerow settled down on a farm with her husband in 1982. She has spent much of her time raising farm animals and writing pieces about agriculture, farming, and similar topics in magazines and full-length books she has published from the 1970s through the 2020s.

== Early life and education ==
Damerow was born on February 29, 1944, in Denver, Colorado. She graduated cum laude from the University of Arizona with a degree in mathematics.

== Career ==
Damerow spent some of her early adult life in Alaska, where she was gifted an ice cream freezer in 1966 for Christmas and then bought an ice cream maker and recipe book to complement it. The lack of insightful recipes for the device would form the basis for her later book on the topic. She moved to Sonoma County, California, before later settling in Tennessee.

As an author, Damerow has written books on animal husbandry, gardening, general agriculture, and on the sale of consumer products. She has also worked as a teacher for classes on writing and how to be an author at the Tennessee Technological University. She has worked as a marketing consultant, while contributing several hundred articles to various magazines. Additionally, she is the author of a monthly column within the magazine Dairy Goat Journal, along with being the producer of food recipes that she sells to various product manufacturers. Described by Bonnie Powell of Grist as "poultry's Cesar Millan", Powell noted that Damerow's most well-known and successful work was Storey's Guide to Raising Chickens, which is "the primer for all things chicken".

== Personal life ==
While traveling in California, Damerow met her future husband, Allan Damerow, and they chose to go on a cross-country trip together. They eventually settled in Cookeville, Tennessee, due to its proximity to a university. They bought a farm north of Gainesboro, Tennessee, in February 1982 and remodeled it.

== Awards and honors ==
Damerow's book Ice Cream! The Whole Scoop was nominated for the 1992 James Beard Award for best Baking & Desserts book. It was described by The New York Times as the authoritative book on ice cream.

== Bibliography ==
- —; Luttmann, Rick (1976). Chickens in Your Backyard: A Beginner's Guide. Rodale. p. 176. ISBN 9781635650969.
- — (1987). Ice Cream!: The Whole Scoop. Glenbridge Publishing. p. 384. ISBN 9780944435298.
- — (1992). Fences for Pasture & Garden. Storey Books. p. 160. ISBN 9781603427524.
- — (1993). Your Chickens: A Kid's Guide to Raising and Showing. Storey Books. p. 160. ISBN 9781603427579.
- — (1993). Your Goats: A Kid's Guide to Raising and Showing. Storey Books. p. 176. ISBN 9781603427654.
- — (1994). The Chicken Health Handbook: A Complete Guide to Maximizing Flock Health and Dealing with Disease. Storey Books. p. 496. ISBN 9781603428583.
- — (1995). Storey's Guide to Raising Chickens. Storey Books. p. 341. ISBN 9781580173254.
- — (1997). The Perfect Pumpkin: Growing/Cooking/Carving. Storey Books. p. 224. ISBN 9781603427418.
- — (1998). Grow Giant Pumpkins: Storey's Country Wisdom Bulletin A-187. Storey Books. p. 32. ISBN 9781580171397.
- — (1999). Building Chicken Coops: Storey Country Wisdom Bulletin A-224. Storey Books. p. 32. ISBN 9781603423465.
- —, ed. (2002). Barnyard in Your Backyard: A Beginner's Guide to Raising Chickens, Ducks, Geese, Rabbits, Goats, Sheep, and Cows. Storey Books. p. 408. ISBN 9781580174565.
- —; Rice, Alina (2008). Draft Horses and Mules: Harnessing Equine Power for Farm & Show. Storey Books. p. 262. ISBN 9781603426428.
- — (2011). The Backyard Homestead Guide to Raising Farm Animals. Echo Point Books & Media. p. 360. ISBN 9781635614886.
- — (2012). The Chicken Encyclopedia: An Illustrated Reference. Storey Books. p. 320. ISBN 9781603427760.
- — (2013). Hatching & Brooding Your Own Chicks: Chickens, Turkeys, Ducks, Geese, Guinea Fowl. Storey Books. p. 240. ISBN 9781612120140.
- — (2019). What's Killing My Chickens?: The Poultry Predator Detective Manual. Storey Books. p. 272. ISBN 9781612129099.
- — (2023). An Absolute Beginner's Guide to Raising Backyard Ducks: Breeds, Feeding, Housing and Care, Eggs and Meat. Storey Books. p. 176. ISBN 9781635865301.
