= Prince Leopold =

Prince Leopold may refer to:

== People ==
=== Anhalt-Dessau ===
- Leopold I, Prince of Anhalt-Dessau (1676–1747)
- Leopold II, Prince of Anhalt-Dessau (1700–1751)

=== Bavaria ===
- Prince Leopold of Bavaria (1846–1930)
- Prince Leopold of Bavaria (born 1943)

=== Belgium ===
- Leopold I of Belgium (1790–1865), Prince of Saxe-Coburg and Gotha before becoming king in 1831
- Leopold II of Belgium (1835–1909), before becoming king in 1865
- Leopold III of Belgium (1901–1983), before becoming king in 1934
- Prince Leopold, Duke of Brabant (1859–1869)

=== Lippe ===
- Leopold I, Prince of Lippe (1767–1802)
- Leopold II, Prince of Lippe (1796–1851)
- Leopold III, Prince of Lippe (1821–1875)
- Leopold IV, Prince of Lippe (1871–1949)

=== Others ===
- Leopold, Prince of Anhalt-Köthen, (1694–1728)
- Leopold, Prince of Hohenzollern (1835–1905)
- Leopold, Prince of Salerno (1790–1851)
- Prince Leopold, Duke of Albany (1853–1884)
- Prince Leopold of Saxe-Coburg and Gotha (1824–1884)
- Prince Leopold, Count of Syracuse (1813–1860)
- Lord Leopold Mountbatten (1889–1922), known as Prince Leopold of Battenberg from his birth until 1917

== Other uses ==
- Prince Leopold (horse), a racehorse
- Prince Leopold Island, Nunavut, Canada
- Léopold Clément, Hereditary Prince of Lorraine (1707–1723), heir apparent to Duchy of Lorraine
- Prince Leopold Clement of Saxe-Coburg and Gotha (1878–1916), Austro-Hungarian officer; heir apparent to House of Koháry's wealth
