= Leopold Township, Perry County, Indiana =

Leopold Township
- Township
- Location in Perry County
- Coordinates: 38°06′13″N 86°36′23″W
- Country: United States
- State: Indiana
- County: Perry

Government
  - Type: Indiana township

Area
  - Total: 32.37 sq mi (83.8 km^{2})
  - Land: 32.11 sq mi (83.2 km^{2})
  - Water: 0.26 sq mi (0.67 km^{2}) 0.80%
- Elevation: 659 ft (201 m)

Population (2020)
  - Total: 717
  - Density: 22.3/sq mi (8.62/km^{2})
- ZIP codes: 47514, 47515, 47520, 47525, 47551, 47576, 47586
- GNIS feature ID: 453547

Leopold Township is one of seven townships in Perry County, Indiana, United States. As of the 2020 census, its population was 717 and it contained 317 housing units.

Historical population
Census	Pop.	Note	%±
1890	899		—
1900	868		−3.4%
1910	758		−12.7%
1920	726		−4.2%
1930	664		−8.5%
1940	629		−5.3%
1950	602		−4.3%
1960	544		−9.6%
1970	566		4.0%
1980	619		9.4%
1990	623		0.6%
2000	720		15.6%
2010	765		6.3%
2020	717		−6.3%
Source: US Decennial Census

== History ==
Leopold Township was established in 1847, and named after Leopold I of Belgium.

== Geography ==
According to the 2010 census, the township has a total area of 32.37 square miles (83.8 km^{2}), of which 32.11 square miles (83.2 km^{2}) (or 99.20%) is land and 0.26 square miles (0.67 km^{2}) (or 0.80%) is water.

=== Unincorporated towns ===
- Leopold at 38.103949°N 86.583316°W

(This list is based on USGS data and may include former settlements.)

=== Cemeteries ===
The township contains these five cemeteries: Frakes, Lanman, Rennie, Rhodes and Saint Johns.

=== Major highways ===
- Indiana State Road 37

=== Lakes ===
- Tipsaw Lake

== School districts ==
- Perry Central Community School Corporation

== Political districts ==
- State House District 73
- State Senate District 47
