= Johann Gottfried Langermann =

German psychiatrist (1768–1832)

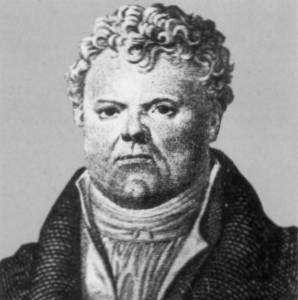
Johann Gottfried Langermann

Johann Gottfried Langermann (8 August 1768 – 6 September 1832) was a German psychiatrist and administrator born in Maxen, near Dresden.

Initially he studied law in Leipzig, afterwards transferring to the University of Jena, where his focus turned to medicine. At Jena he had as instructors Christoph Wilhelm Hufeland (1762–1836) and philosopher Johann Gottlieb Fichte (1762–1814). In 1797 he obtained his medical doctorate with a dissertation on the diagnosis and treatment of melancholia. He worked for a period of time as a physician in a madhouse in Torgau, and from 1805 to 1810 was director of a psychiatric institute at Bayreuth. Later in his career he was appointed director of Prussian Health Services, where he wielded influence on the overall development of Prussian mental hospitals.

During his tenure at Bayreuth he made efforts at transforming a former penitentiary-madhouse into a place of treatment for the mentally ill, having limited success. As a psychiatrist he equated mental illness with uncontrolled passions, and defined treatment as establishing control of reason over passions by educational means.
