= Johann Christian August Heinroth =

German physician and psychologist

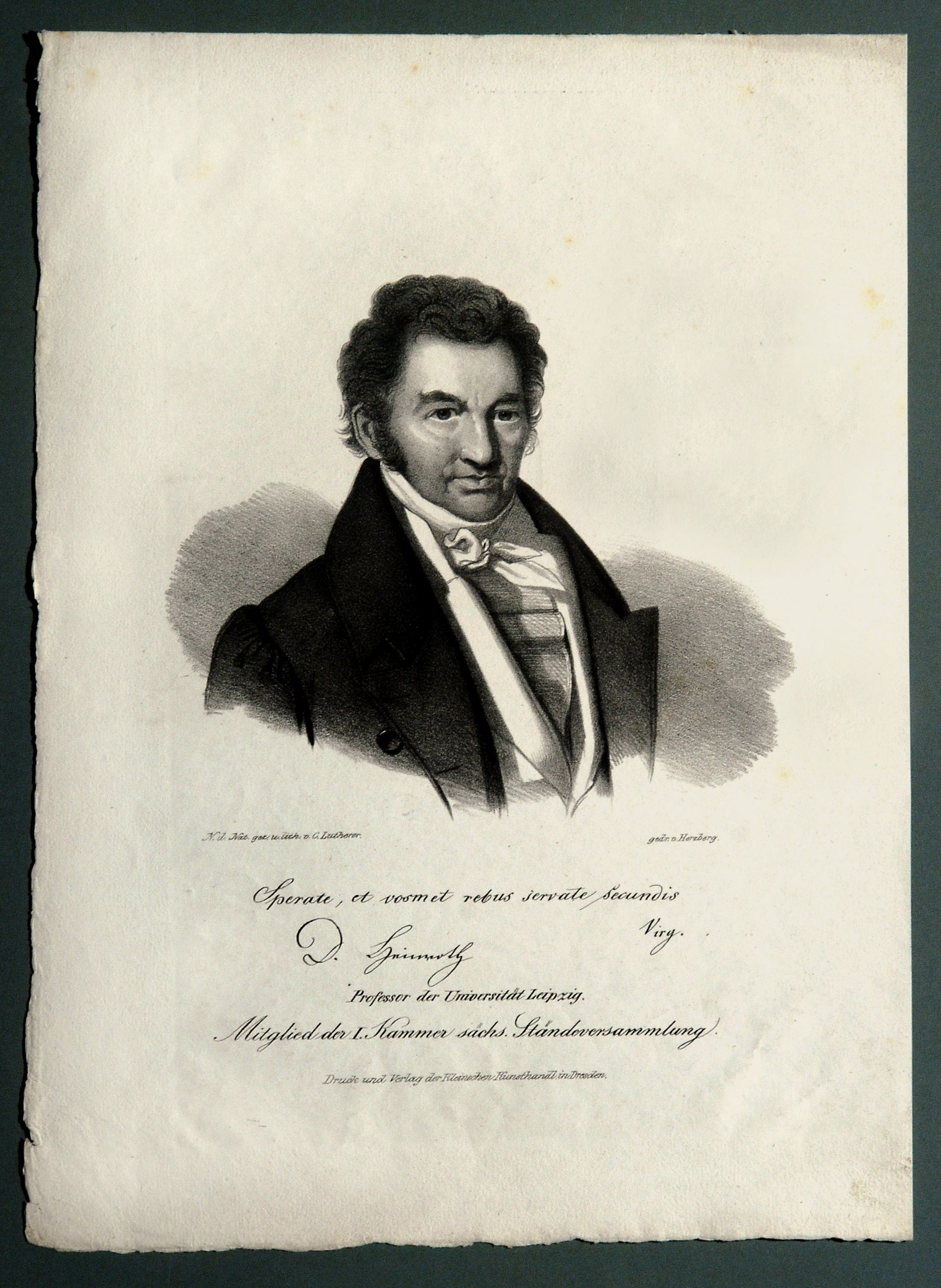
Johann Christian August Heinroth ca. 1811.

Johann Christian August Heinroth (17 January 1773 – 26 October 1843) was a German medical doctor and psychologist who was the first to use the term psychosomatic. Heinroth divided the human personality into three components in the 1800s, describing the Uberuns (conscience), the Ich (mind, emotions and will) and the Fleish (basic drives, which included man's sinful nature).

== Life ==
Heinroth was born in Leipzig. He initially studied medicine there, later continuing his education in Vienna under Johann Peter Frank (1745–1821). After briefly studying theology in Erlangen, he returned to Leipzig, where in 1805 he obtained his medical doctorate. In 1806 he became a lecturer at the University of Leipzig, where in 1827 he was appointed a full professor of physical medicine.

Heinroth is largely remembered for seminal work done in the field of psychiatry. His views on psychiatric thought have been described as a combination of anthropology and holistic medicine. He believed that the soul had primacy over the body, and that the body and soul interacted in several ways. Consequently, mental sickness and many somatic illnesses are caused by the soul. In 1818 he introduced the term "psychosomatic" into medical literature.

Heinroth regarded sin as a cause of mental illness. His description of sin came from a 19th-century Protestant standpoint, and was also derived from an accepted European code of ethics and morality. His definition of sin wasn't based on a singular event, but rather as a period of several years of an individual striving towards earthly, bodily satisfaction. From a philosophical point of view, Heinroth espoused the teachings of Johann Gottfried Herder (1744–1803).

In his 1818 textbook Störungen des Seelenlebens he classified mental disorders into different categories. The three main categories were named the exaltations, the depressions and the "mixed states" (Mischung) of exaltation and weakness. He further divided the mixed states category into subcategories called 'mixed mood disorders', 'mixed mental disorders' and 'mixed volition disorders'.

Heinroth died on October 26, 1843, in Leipzig.

== Selected writings ==
- Beyträge zur Krankheitslehre (Contributions to the study of illness), 1810.
- Lehrbuch der Störungen des Seelenlebens (Textbook on the disorders of the soul), Leipzig 1818. two volumes, Volume 1 @googlebooks; volume 2
- Lehrbuch der Anthropologie (Textbook of anthropology), Leipzig 1822.
- Lehrbuch der Seelengesundheitskunde (Textbook of mental health), Leipzig 1823.
- System der psychisch-gerichtlichen Medizin (A system of forensic psychiatric medicine), Leipzig 1825.
- Grundzüge der Criminal-Psychologie: oder, Die Theorie des Bösen Grundzüge der Criminal-Psychologie oder Die Theorie des Bösen (On the theory of evil), Berlin 1833.

== Secondary literature ==
- Schmideler S, Steinberg H. Johann Christian August Heinroth (1773–1843). In: Wiemers G (Eds). Sächsische Lebensbilder Vol. 6, pt. 1, Stuttgart: Franz Steiner Verlag 2009:313-337
- Steinberg H. Johann Christian August Heinroth (1773–1843) - Der erste Lehrstuhlinhaber für Psychiatrie und sein Krankheitskonzept. In: Angermeyer MC, Steinberg H (Eds). 200 Jahre Psychiatrie an der Universität Leipzig. Personen und Konzepte. Heidelberg: Springer Medizin Verlag, 2005: 1-80
- Steinberg, H (2004). "Die Errichtung des ersten psychiatrischen Lehrstuhls: Johann Christian August Heinroth in Leipzig" [Creation of the first university chair in psychiatry: Johann Christian August Heinroth in Leipzig]. Der Nervenarzt (in German). 75 (3): 303–7. doi:10.1007/s00115-003-1605-3. PMID 15021930. S2CID 7565278.
- Steinberg, H (2004). "The sin in the aetiological concept of Johann Christian August Heinroth (1773-1843). Part 1: Between theology and psychiatry. Heinroth's concepts of 'whose being', 'freedom', 'reason' and 'disturbance of the soul'". History of Psychiatry. 15 (59 Pt 3): 329–44. doi:10.1177/0957154x04043740. PMID 15386866. S2CID 29440062.
- Steinberg, H (2004). "The sin in the aetiological concept of Johann Christian August Heinroth (1773-1843): Part 2: Self-guilt as turning away from reason in the framework of Heinroth's concept of the interrelationships between body and soul". History of Psychiatry. 15 (60 Pt 4): 437–54. doi:10.1177/0957154x04043742. PMID 15628028. S2CID 34027480.
- Marneros, Andreas; Goodwin, Frederick, eds. (2005). Bipolar Disorders. Cambridge: Cambridge University Press. ISBN 978-0-521-83517-6.
