= Jan van der Merwe =

Jan van der Merwe may refer to:

- Jan van der Merwe (athlete), South African athlete
- Jan van der Merwe (rugby union), South African rugby union player
- Jan van der Merwe (wrestler), South African Olympic wrestler
- Jan H van der Merwe, South African physicist
