= Stranski–Krastanov growth =

Growth of a thin film on a crystal surface

Stranski–Krastanov growth (SK growth, also Stransky–Krastanov or 'Stranski–Krastanow') is one of the three primary modes by which thin films grow epitaxially at a crystal surface or interface. Also known as 'layer-plus-island growth', the SK mode follows a two step process: initially, complete films of adsorbates, up to several monolayers thick, grow in a layer-by-layer fashion on a crystal substrate. Beyond a critical layer thickness, which depends on strain and the chemical potential of the deposited film, growth continues through the nucleation and coalescence of adsorbate 'islands'. This growth mechanism was first noted by Ivan Stranski and Lyubomir Krastanov in 1938. It wasn't until 1958 however, in a seminal work by Ernst Bauer published in Zeitschrift für Kristallographie, that the SK, Volmer–Weber, and Frank–van der Merwe mechanisms were systematically classified as the primary thin-film growth processes. Since then, SK growth has been the subject of intense investigation, not only to better understand the complex thermodynamics and kinetics at the core of thin-film formation, but also as a route to fabricating novel nanostructures for application in the microelectronics industry.

== Modes of thin-film growth ==
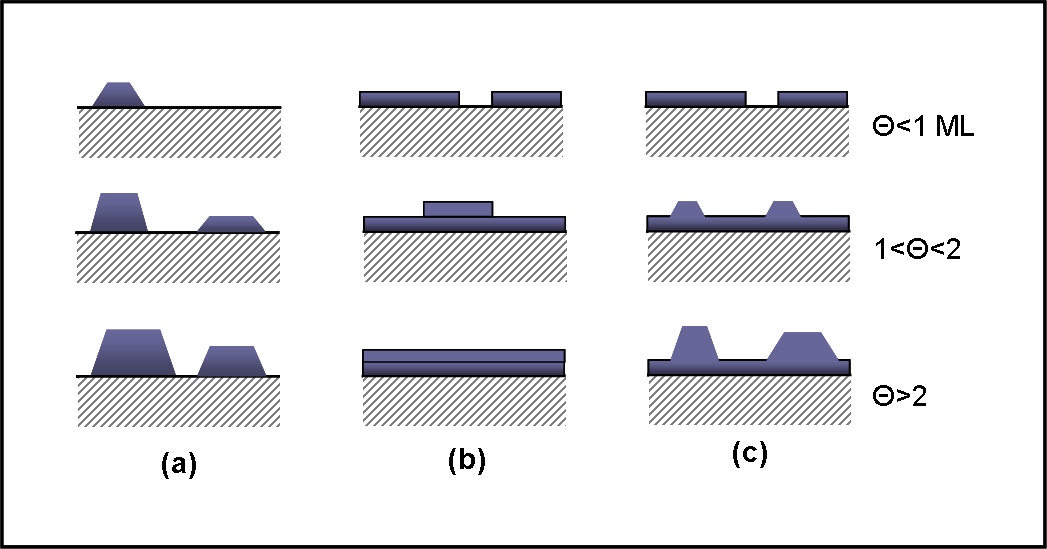
Figure 1. Cross-section views of the three primary modes of thin-film growth including (a) Volmer–Weber (VW: island formation), (b) Frank–van der Merwe (FM: layer-by-layer), and (c) Stranski–Krastanov (SK: layer-plus-island). Each mode is shown for several different amounts of surface coverage, Θ.

The growth of epitaxial (homogeneous or heterogeneous) thin films on a single crystal surface depends critically on the interaction strength between adatoms and the surface. While it is possible to grow epilayers from a liquid solution, most epitaxial growth occurs via a vapor phase technique such as molecular beam epitaxy (MBE). In Volmer–Weber (VW) growth, adatom–adatom interactions are stronger than those of the adatom with the surface, leading to the formation of three-dimensional adatom clusters or islands. Growth of these clusters, along with coarsening, will cause rough multi-layer films to grow on the substrate surface. Antithetically, during Frank–van der Merwe (FM) growth, adatoms attach preferentially to surface sites resulting in atomically smooth, fully formed layers. This layer-by-layer growth is two-dimensional, indicating that complete films form prior to growth of subsequent layers. Stranski–Krastanov growth is an intermediary process characterized by both 2D layer and 3D island growth. Transition from the layer-by-layer to island-based growth occurs at a critical layer thickness which is highly dependent on the chemical and physical properties, such as surface energies and lattice parameters, of the substrate and film. Figure 1 is a schematic representation of the three main growth modes for various surface coverages.

Determining the mechanism by which a thin film grows requires consideration of the chemical potentials of the first few deposited layers. A model for the layer chemical potential per atom has been proposed by Markov as:

$$\mu(n) = \mu_\infty +[\varphi_a - \varphi_a'(n) + \varepsilon_d(n) + \varepsilon_e(n)]$$

where $\mu_\infty$ is the bulk chemical potential of the adsorbate material, $\varphi_a$ is the desorption energy of an adsorbate atom from a wetting layer of the same material, $\varphi_a'(n)$ the desorption energy of an adsorbate atom from the substrate, $\varepsilon_d(n)$ is the per atom misfit dislocation energy, and $\varepsilon_e(n)$ the per atom homogeneous strain energy. In general, the values of $\varphi_a$, $\varphi_a'(n)$, $\varepsilon_d(n)$, and $\varepsilon_e(n)$ depend in a complex way on the thickness of the growing layers and lattice misfit between the substrate and adsorbate film. In the limit of small strains, $\varepsilon_{d,e}(n) \ll \mu_\infty$, the criterion for a film growth mode is dependent on $\frac{d\mu}{dn}$.

- VW growth: $\frac{d\mu}{dn} < 0$ (adatom cohesive force is stronger than surface adhesive force)
- FM growth: $\frac{d\mu}{dn} > 0$ (surface adhesive force is stronger than adatom cohesive force)

SK growth can be described by both of these inequalities. While initial film growth follows an FM mechanism, i.e. positive differential μ, nontrivial amounts of strain energy accumulate in the deposited layers. At a critical thickness, this strain induces a sign reversal in the chemical potential, i.e. negative differential μ, leading to a switch in the growth mode. At this point it is energetically favorable to nucleate islands and further growth occurs by a VW type mechanism. A thermodynamic criterion for layer growth similar to the one presented above can be obtained using a force balance of surface tensions and contact angle.

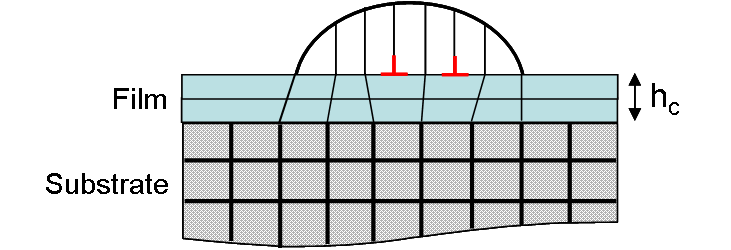
Figure 2. SK growth showing island formation after obtaining a critical thickness, $h_C$. Lines represent lattice planes with thicker lines for the substrate lattice and thinner lines for the growing film. Edge dislocations are highlighted in red at the film/island interface.

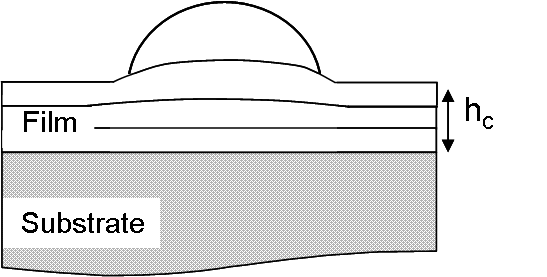
Figure 3. Coherent island formation under SK growth. Local curvature of the near surface region surrounding the island leads to elastic deformation of the island and wetting layer thereby reducing the accumulated strain. These islands are defect free.

Since the formation of wetting layers occurs in a commensurate fashion at a crystal surface, there is often an associated misfit between the film and the substrate due to the different lattice parameters of each material. Attachment of the thinner film to the thicker substrate induces a misfit strain at the interface given by $\frac{a_{f} - a_{s}}{ a_{s}}$. Here $a_f$ and $a_s$ are the film and substrate lattice constants, respectively. As the wetting layer thickens, the associated strain energy increases rapidly. In order to relieve the strain, island formation can occur in either a dislocated or coherent fashion. In dislocated islands, strain relief arises by forming interfacial misfit dislocations. The reduction in strain energy accommodated by introducing a dislocation is generally greater than the concomitant cost of increased surface energy associated with creating the clusters. The thickness of the wetting layer at which island nucleation initiates, called the critical thickness $h_C$, is strongly dependent on the lattice mismatch between the film and substrate, with a greater mismatch leading to smaller critical thicknesses. Values of $h_C$ can range from submonlayer coverage to up to several monolayers thick. Figure 2 illustrates a dislocated island during SK growth after reaching a critical layer height. A pure edge dislocation is shown at the island interface to illustrate the relieved structure of the cluster.

In some cases, most notably the Si/Ge system, nanoscale dislocation-free islands can be formed during SK growth by introducing undulations into the near surface layers of the substrate. These regions of local curvature serve to elastically deform both the substrate and island, relieving accumulated strain and bringing the wetting layer and island lattice constant closer to its bulk value. This elastic instability at $h_C$ is known as the Grinfeld instability (formerly Asaro–Tiller–Grinfeld; ATG). The resulting islands are coherent and defect-free, garnering them significant interest for use in nanoscale electronic and optoelectronic devices. Such applications are discussed briefly later. A schematic of the resulting epitaxial structure is shown in figure 3 which highlights the induced radius of curvature at the substrate surface and in the island. Finally, strain stabilization indicative of coherent SK growth decreases with decreasing inter-island separation. At large areal island densities (smaller spacing), curvature effects from neighboring clusters will cause dislocation loops to form leading to defected island creation.

== Monitoring SK growth ==
=== Wide beam techniques ===
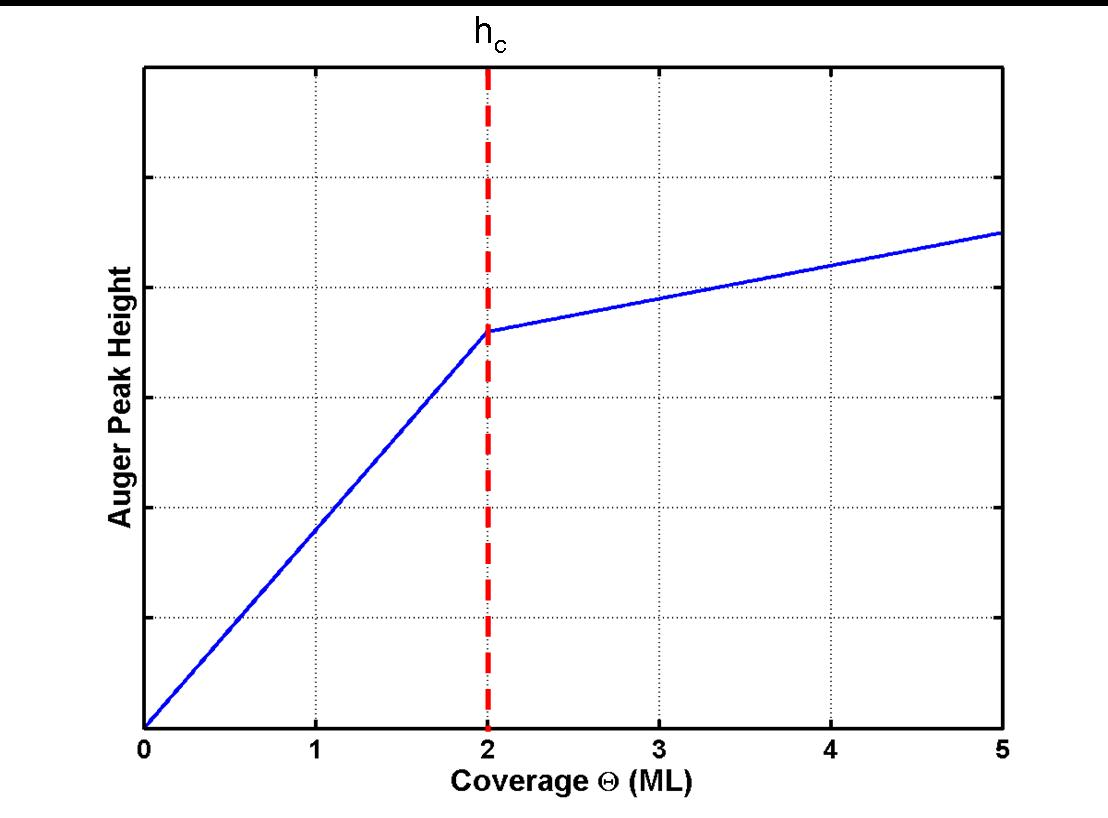
Figure 4. Evolution of Auger peak height as function of surface coverage during SK growth. The plot is a series of segmented linear curves with a clear break point indicating the critical thickness (clearly marked in the diagram) and the onset of island growth. Slope differences are due to the different modes of growth. The initial steep-sloped segment corresponds to the FM growth mode while the later, shallow-sloped region is representative of the VW mode. This schematic is characteristic of 'ideal' SK growth where nucleation onset begins at 2 monolayer coverage.

Analytical techniques such as Auger electron spectroscopy (AES), low-energy electron diffraction (LEED), and reflection high energy electron diffraction (RHEED), have been extensively used to monitor SK growth. AES data obtained in situ during film growth in a number model systems, such as Pd/W(100), Pb/Cu(110), Ag/W(110), and Ag/Fe(110), show characteristic segmented curves like those presented in figure 4. Height of the film Auger peaks plotted as a function of surface coverage Θ, initially exhibits a straight line, which is indicative of AES data for FM growth. There is a clear break point at a critical adsorbate surface coverage followed by another linear segment at a reduced slope. The paired break point and shallow line slope is characteristic of island nucleation; a similar plot for FM growth would exhibit many such line and break pairs while a plot of the VW mode would be a single line of low slope. In some systems, reorganization of the 2D wetting layer results in decreasing AES peaks with increasing adsorbate coverage. Such situations arise when many adatoms are required to reach a critical nucleus size on the surface and at nucleation the resulting adsorbed layer constitutes a significant fraction of a monolayer. After nucleation, metastable adatoms on the surface are incorporated into the nuclei, causing the Auger signal to fall. This phenomenon is particularly evident for deposits on a molybdenum substrate.

Evolution of island formation during a SK transitions have also been successfully measured using LEED and RHEED techniques. Diffraction data obtained via various LEED experiments have been effectively used in conjunction with AES to measure the critical layer thickness at the onset of island formation. In addition, RHEED oscillations have proven very sensitive to the layer-to-island transition during SK growth, with the diffraction data providing detailed crystallographic information about the nucleated islands. Following the time dependence of LEED, RHEED, and AES signals, extensive information on surface kinetics and thermodynamics has been gathered for a number of technologically relevant systems.

=== Microscopies ===
Unlike the techniques presented in the last section in which probe size can be relatively large compared to island size, surface microscopies such scanning electron microscopy (SEM), transmission electron microscopy (TEM), scanning tunneling microscopy (STM), and Atomic force microscopy (AFM) offer the opportunity for direct viewing of deposit/substrate combination events. The extreme magnifications afforded by these techniques, often down to the nanometer length scale, make them particularly applicable for visualizing the strongly 3D islands. UHV-SEM and TEM are routinely used to image island formation during SK growth, enabling a wide range of information to be gathered, ranging from island densities to equilibrium shapes. AFM and STM have become increasingly utilized to correlate island geometry to the surface morphology of the surrounding substrate and wetting layer. These visualization tools are often used to complement quantitative information gathered during wide-beam analyses.

== Application to nanotechnology ==
As mentioned previously, coherent island formation during SK growth has attracted increased interest as a means for fabricating epitaxial nanoscale structures, particularly quantum dots (QDs). Widely used quantum dots grown in the SK-growth-mode are based on the material combinations Si/Ge or InAs/GaAs. Significant effort has been spent developing methods to control island organization, density, and size on a substrate. Techniques such as surface dimpling with a pulsed laser and control over growth rate have been successfully applied to alter the onset of the SK transition or even suppress it altogether. The ability to control this transition either spatially or temporally enables manipulation of physical parameters of the nanostructures, like geometry and size, which, in turn, can alter their electronic or optoelectronic properties (i.e. band gap). For example, Schwarz–Selinger, et al. have used surface dimpling to create surface miscuts on Si that provide preferential Ge island nucleation sites surrounded by a denuded zone. In a similar fashion, lithographically patterned substrates have been used as nucleation templates for SiGe clusters. Several studies have also shown that island geometries can be altered during SK growth by controlling substrate relief and growth rate. Bimodal size distributions of Ge islands on Si are a striking example of this phenomenon in which pyramidal and dome-shaped islands coexist after Ge growth on a textured Si substrate. Such ability to control the size, location, and shape of these structures could provide invaluable techniques for 'bottom-up' fabrication schemes of next-generation devices in the microelectronics industry.

== See also ==
- Epitaxy
- Thin films
- Molecular-beam epitaxy
