= Rostislaw Kaischew =

Bulgarian physical chemist (1908–2002)

Rostislaw Atanasov Kaischew
- Ростислав Атанасов Каишев
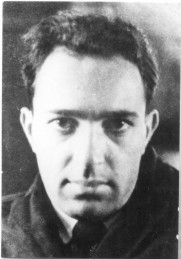
- Rostislav Kaishev, 1964
- Born: February 16, 1908 O.S. Saint Petersburg, Russia
- Died: November 19, 2002 (aged 94); Sofia, Bulgaria
- Citizenship: Bulgaria
- Education: Sofia University; Technische Hochschule zu Breslau
- Known for: Stranski-Kaischew mean separation work method Kaischew construction
- Awards: Cothenius Medal (1987)
- Scientific career
- Workplaces: Sofia University; Bulgarian Academy of Sciences
- Thesis: Thermische Untersuchungen am festen und fliissigen Helium (1932)
- Doctoral advisor: Francis Simon

Rostislaw Kaischew (Bulgarian: Ростислав Атанасов Каишев; February 16, 1908 O.S. (February 29, 1908 (N.S.)), Saint Petersburg, Russian Empire – November 19, 2002, Sofia, Republic of Bulgaria) was a Bulgarian physicochemist and a member of the Bulgarian Academy of Sciences. His most significant contributions to science were within studies of crystal growth and nucleation.

== Biography ==
Kaischew graduated from Sofia University in 1930 and earned his doctorate at Technische Hochschule of Breslau, Germany in 1932. His doctoral adviser was Franz Simon. In 1933, he was appointed an assistant professor at Sofia University, and in 1947 - a professor. At the Bulgarian Academy of Sciences, Kaischew founded the Institute for Physical Chemistry, and held the position of director there from its creation in 1958 until his retirement in 1989. The Institute is named after him.

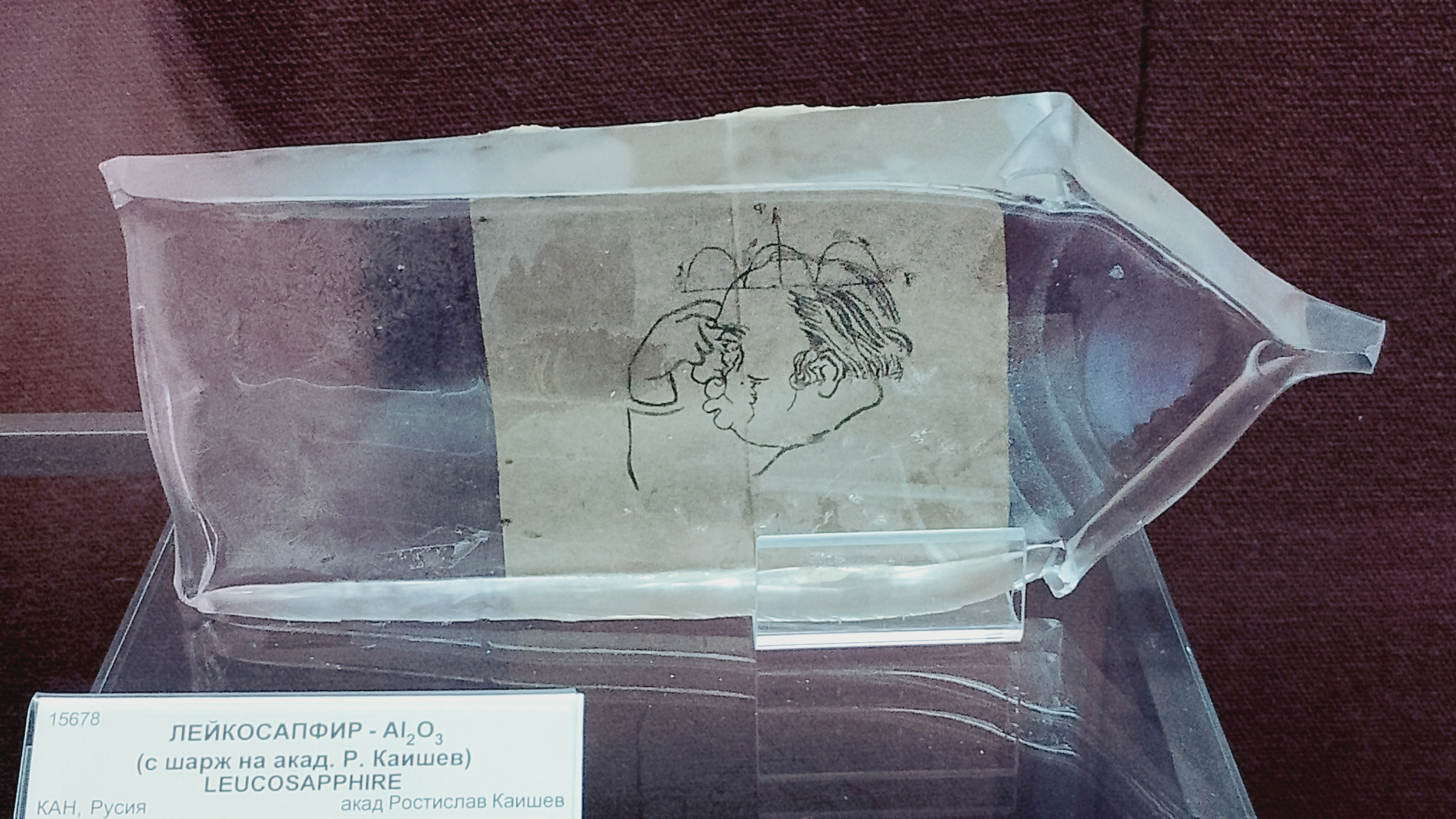
LEUCO SAPPHIRE FROM KAN, RUSSIA, COLL. ROSTISLAW KAISCHEW AT THE EARTH AND MAN NATIONAL MUSEUM IN SOFIA, BULGARIA

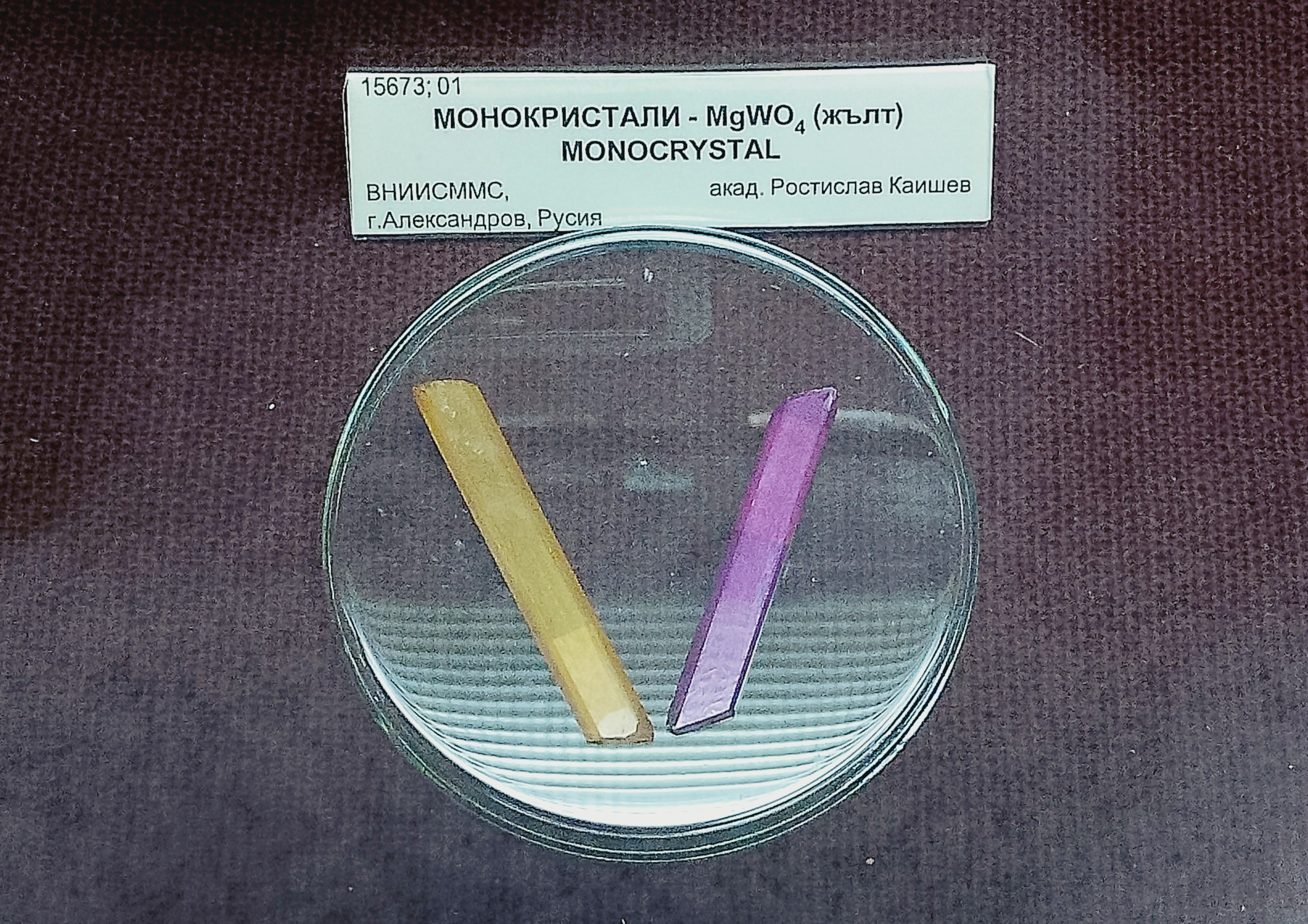
MONOCRYSTALS - MAGNESIUM TUNGSTEN OXIDE - FROM ALEXANDROV, RUSSIA, COLL. ROSTISLAW KAISCHEW AT THE EARTH AND MAN NATIONAL MUSEUM, SOFIA, BULGARIA

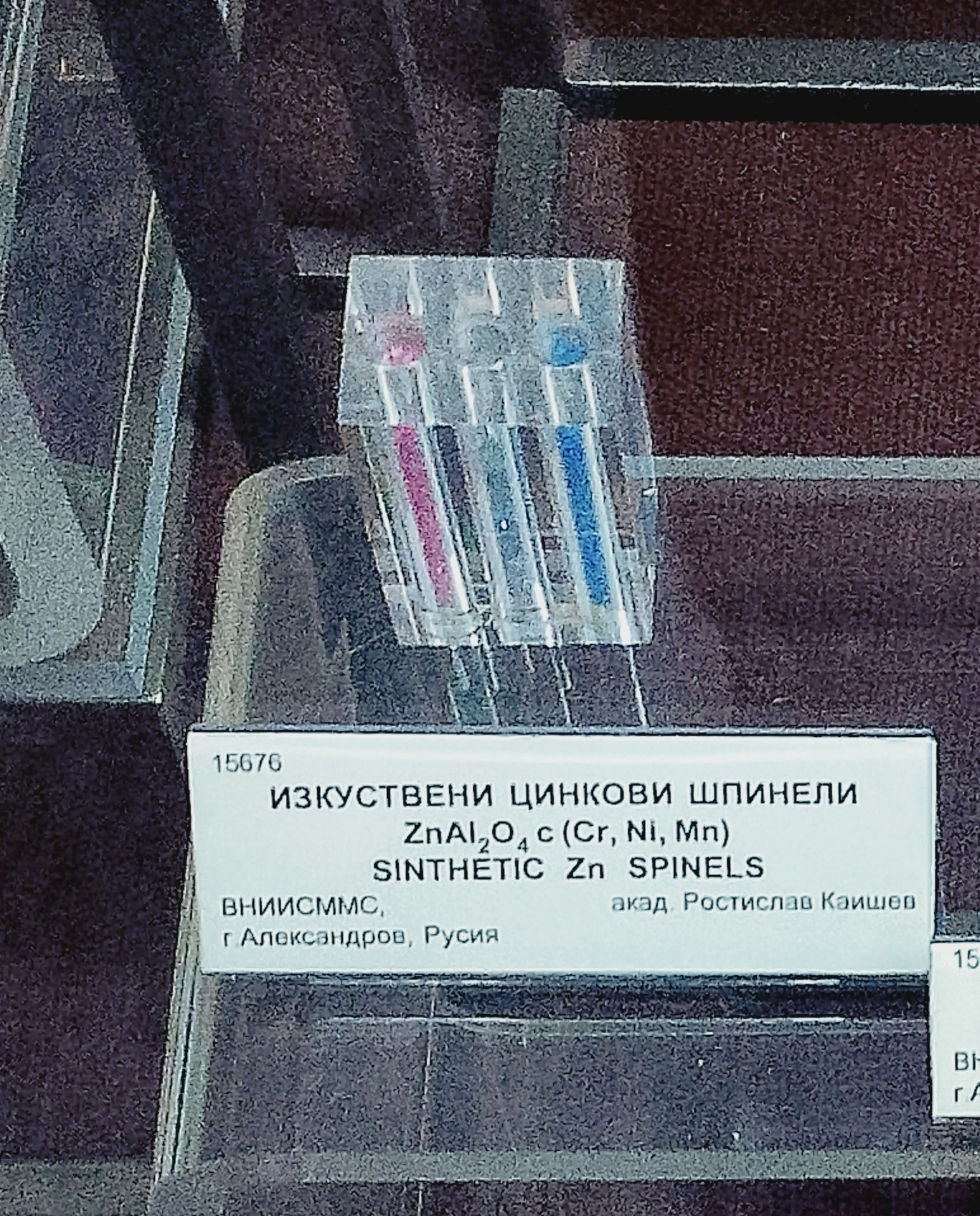
SYNTHETIC ZN SPINELS FROM ALEXANDROV, RUSSIA, COLL. ROSTISLAW KAISCHEW AT THE EARTH AND MAN NATIONAL MUSEUM IN SOFIA, BULGARIA

== Selected bibliography ==
- Stranski, I. N.; Kaischew, R. (1931). "Gleichgewichtsformen homöopolarer Kristalle". Zeitschrift für Physikalische Chemie (in German). 78 (1–6): 373–385. doi:10.1524/zkri.1931.78.1.373.
- Kaischew, R.; Stranski, I. N. (1934). "Zur Theorie der linearen Kristallisationsgeschwindigkeit". Zeitschrift für Physikalische Chemie. 170A (1): 295–299. doi:10.1515/zpch-1934-17027.
- Kaischew, R. (1936). "Zur Theorie des Kristallwachstums". Z. Physik. 102 (9–10): 684–690. Bibcode:1936ZPhy..102..684K. doi:10.1007/BF01337739.
- Kaischew, R. (March 1981). "On the history of the creation of the molecular-kinetic theory of crystal growth: Honoring the memory of I.N. Stranski". Journal of Crystal Growth. 51 (3): 643–650. Bibcode:1981JCrGr..51..643K. doi:10.1016/0022-0248(81)90452-8.

== See also ==
- Wulff construction
