= Frank–Van der Merwe growth =

Frank–Van der Merwe growth model

Frank–van der Merwe growth (FM growth) is one of the three primary modes by which thin films grow epitaxially at a crystal surface or interface. It is also known as 'layer-by-layer growth'. It is considered an ideal growth model, requiring perfect lattice matching between the substrate and the layer growing on to it, and it is usually limited to homoepitaxy. For FM growth to occur, the atoms that are to be deposited should be more attracted to the substrate than to each other, which is in contrast to the layer-plus-island growth model. FM growth is the preferred growth model for producing smooth films.

It was first described by South African physicist Jan van der Merwe and British physicist Charles Frank in a series of four papers based on van der Merwe's PhD research between 1947 and 1949.

== See also ==
- Epitaxy
- Thin films
- Molecular-beam epitaxy
