= C. Peter Flynn =

C. Peter Flynn (August 18, 1935 – October 27, 2011) was a Professor of Physics and of Materials Science at the University of Illinois at Urbana-Champaign.

Professor Flynn was on the faculty of the University of Illinois from 1960 until 2011 and served as the director of the Frederick Seitz Materials Research Laboratory from 1978 until 1987. He was a fellow of both the American Physical Society and the American Society for Metals, and was Chairman of the Department of Energy Council on Materials between 1985 and 2005.

He pioneered the technique of molecular beam epitaxy, a method of growing crystalline solids from layers of selected elements. He also helped construct one of the first low energy electron microscopes in the United States.

Flynn was born in Stockton-on-Tees, a small market town in North Yorkshire, England on August 18, 1935. He was the son of Francis Johnson Flynn, a police constable in the village of Hovingham, and his wife, Edith Hannah, a local war-time nurse. Peter received a full scholarship to the University of Leeds where he received his bachelor’s and Ph.D. in Physics in 1960. He subsequently earned an M.A. (Hon.) in physics from the University of Cambridge. In 1960, Peter moved to the United States to take a post-doctoral position with the Physics Department of the University of Illinois at Urbana-Champaign where he worked until May 2011.
