= Jan H van der Merwe =

South African physicist (1922–2016)

- Born: Johannes Hendrik van der Merwe; 28 February 1922; Humpata, Portuguese Angola
- Died: 28 February 2016 (aged 94); South Africa
- Citizenship: South African
- Education: University of Stellenbosch; University of Bristol
- Known for: Epitaxy
- Spouse: Wilhelmina van der Merwe (de Villiers)
- Children: Pauline, Willem, Jan and Anna
- Scientific career
- Institutions: CSIR; University of Port Elizabeth; UNISA; University of Pretoria
- Doctoral advisor: Nevill Francis Mott

Johannes Hendrik van der Merwe (28 February 1922 - 28 February 2016) was a South African mathematician and physicist. The Frank–Van der Merwe crystal growth model carries his name and he was awarded numerous South African academic prizes. He is sometimes referred to as the "Father of Epitaxy". His research is seen as fundamental to applications in communication technology.

== Education and early life ==
Van der Merwe was born on 28 February 1922 to Dorslandtrekkers Johannes Marthinus van der Merwe and Catharina Margaretha van der Merwe in Humpata, Angola. Although his parents both came from large families—his father had four siblings and his mother had five siblings—he was an only child.

In 1928, he and his family moved to South West Africa. It is believed that they travelled by ox-wagon. During his formative years the family moved between present day Outjo and Gobabis and finally settled in Otjiwarongo, where he first attended an actual primary school. He attended secondary school in Windhoek.

In 1941 he attended the University of Stellenbosch, South Africa on a bursary. After obtaining a BSc in engineering at the University of Stellenbosch, he was persuaded by the head of the applied mathematics department to change to an MSc in applied mathematics, which he completed in 1945. In 1946 he was appointed junior lecturer in the department of applied mathematics.

He went to work at the CSIR in Pretoria in 1947 under the supervision of Stefan Meiring Naudé. He was awarded a bursary by the CSIR to study in Britain.

Between 1947 and 1949, he did a PhD in theoretical solid state physics at the University of Bristol under Nevill Francis Mott. During his time in Bristol he befriended several people who went on to become noted physicists including C. F. Powell, Arthur Tyndall and Doris Kuhlmann-Wilsdorf. In late 1949, he returned to the CSIR.

== Career in research ==
It was in Bristol in the period 1947 to 1949 that he started working on intercrystalline boundaries, together with Charles Frank. Eventually their research led them to study epitaxy, and in 1949 they presented the fruits of their research in a series of scientific papers. The result was the Frank–Van der Merwe crystal growth model which carries both their names.

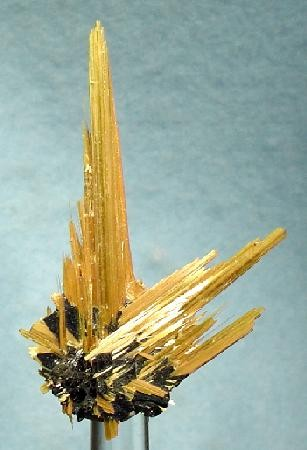
Rutile epitaxial on hematite (Bahia, Brazil)

From 1953 to 1964 he served as senior lecturer and Associate Professor in the physics department at the University of Pretoria. He completed his MSc in Mathematics from the University of Pretoria in 1956. During this period he again worked with a colleague from Bristol, Frank Nabarro who was then head of Physics at the University of the Witwatersrand, South Africa.

In 1961 he took a sabbatical to the University of Virginia which led to a refinement of his initial model of thickening two-dimensional interfaces in 1963.

The theory of epitaxy was a major focus of his career and he published many seminal papers, which resulted in him becoming known as the "Father of Epitaxy". With the advance of the semiconductor industry from the 1960s onward, epitaxy became extremely important as it depends on the growth of perfect single crystals for the manufacturing of transistors and IC circuits. An essential role in understanding how to grow such perfect crystals was provided by his theory.

Van der Merwe's model of atomic forces paved the way for successful modelling of important physical phenomena in solids at the atomic scale. He personally regarded his solution to a differential equation in his PhD thesis as one of his biggest achievements. This was basically a soliton differential equation with an ingenious solution, the first ever analytical solution to a soliton problem. Solitons in solid state and other branches of physics became important for advanced applications in communication technology.

In 1965, he was invited by an ex-CSIR colleague, Ernst Marais, to the University of Port Elizabeth where he was appointed head of the applied mathematics department. During this period Van der Merwe was invited to present plenary talks at many international conferences, during which he made enduring friendships with several surface scientists including Ernst G. Bauer of the Clausthal University of Technology, Germany and Ralf Vanselow of the University of Wisconsin, Milwaukee.

In 1969 he moved to UNISA where he became Professor of applied mathematics. In 1970 he spent a seven-month sabbatical at the University of Virginia where he collaborated with William A. Jesser. Almost 30 years later, in 1999 he co-authored a paper with Jesser.

In 1972, he accepted the position of head of the physics department at the University of Pretoria. From this point on he regularly collaborated with Gary Shiflet of the University of Virginia. Almost 20 years later, Shiflet and Van der Merwe co-authored papers on interphase boundaries.

After his mandatory retirement at age 65, he became Professor Extraordinarius at UNISA from 1990 to 2003, and Honorary Professor in the Department of Physics at University of Pretoria from 2004 to 2016.

In 1981 and 1989 he was Visiting Professor at the Clausthal University of Technology, Germany, and Visiting Researcher to Kodak Research Labs in Rochester, New York, in 1981.

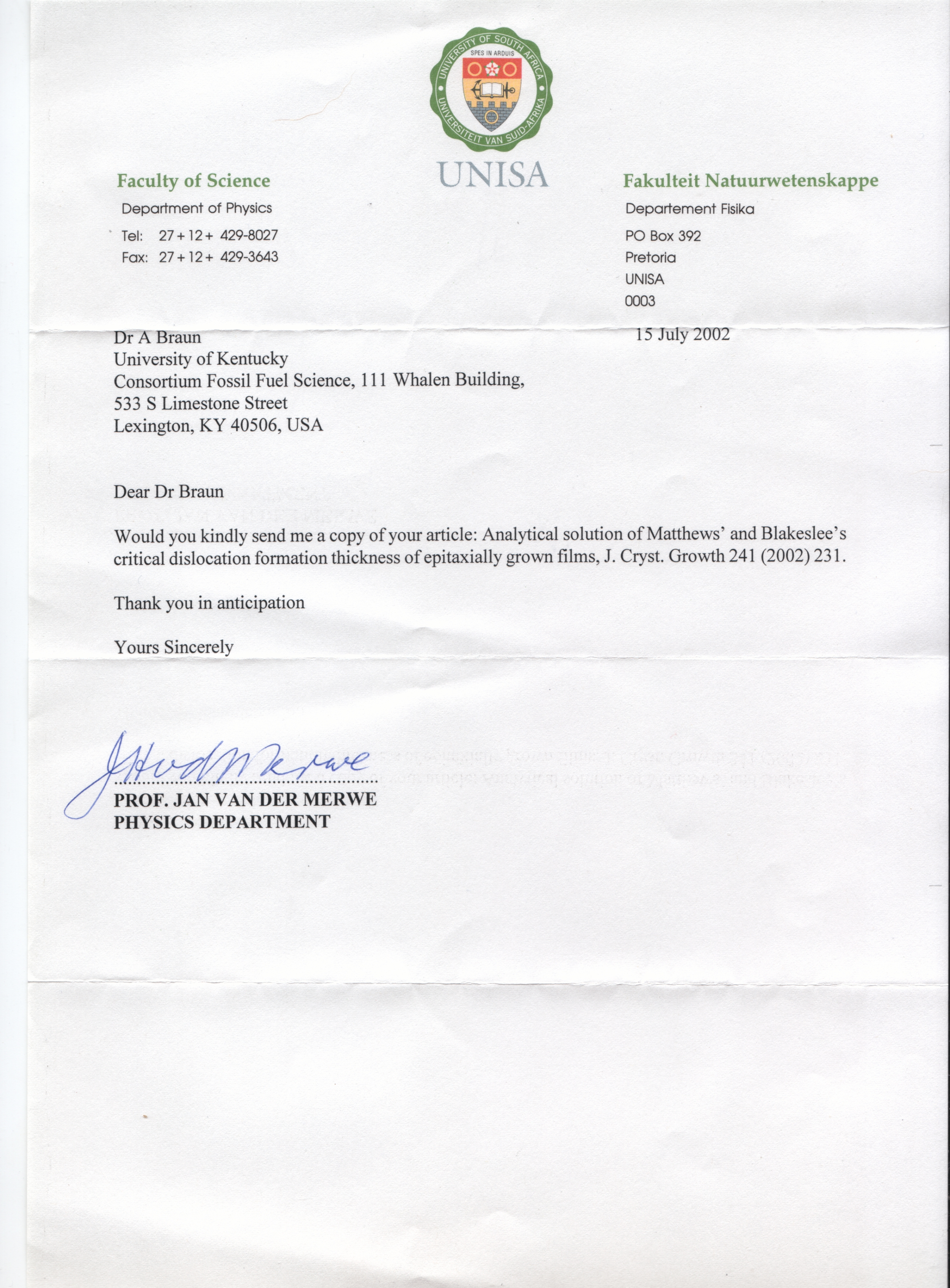
Letter from Jan H van der Merwe at the age of 80 in 2002, requesting the copy of a publication about an analytical solution to a mathematical model from a colleague.

== Awards and honours ==
Some of the awards presented to Van der Merwe are:

- Havenga Prize for Physics (1967) from the Suid-Afikaanse Akademie vir Wetenskap en Kuns (South African Academy of Science and Art)
- E.W. Muller Award (University of Wisconsin–Milwaukee, USA)
- FRD A rating first awarded in 1984 and re-awarded until the end of his working career (National Research Foundation)
- De Beers Gold Medal in Physics (1984)
- DSc (honoris causa) University of South Africa (1984),
- SAMS award for the best publication in the South African Journal of Physics (1987)
- The South Africa Order for Excellent Service, Class 1: Gold (1989)
- DSc (honoris causa) University of Pretoria (1990)
- DSc (honoris causa) University of Port Elizabeth (1994)
- Gold Medal of the South African Association for the Advancement of Science (1998)
- Tuks Alumni Laureatus Award for Eminent Scientific Achievements (2000)
- Centenary Award, Leading Minds 1908 to 2008 (University of Pretoria) (2008)

In 2000 a Symposium in honour of Van der Merwe was arranged by the American Society for Metals, Materials and Minerals to celebrate the 50th anniversary of his discovery of Interfacial Dislocations.

The Materials Research Society published a Focus Issue titled "Jan van der Merwe: Epitaxy and the Computer Age" in November 2017.

== Personal life ==
In 1947, just before leaving South Africa for Bristol, he married Minnie de Villiers and they had their honeymoon on the ship to the UK. In late 1949 they returned to Pretoria, South Africa in time for the birth of their first child Pauline (1950). Willem was born in 1954, Jan in 1957 and Anna was adopted in 1957.

His son Jan died in 1994, his daughter Pauline in 1999 and his wife in 2006. Van der Merwe died on his birthday, 28 February 2016 at the home of his son Willem.
