= Adparticle =

Particle adsorbed onto the surface of a solid

An adparticle is an atom, molecule, or cluster of atoms or molecules that lies on a crystal surface. The term is used in surface chemistry. The word is a contraction of "adsorbed particle". An adparticle that is a single atom may be referred to as an "adatom".
