= Keith Burton =

English physicist (1922–1996)

William Keith Burton (known as Keith Burton) FRSE (12 October 1922 – 30 December 1996) was an English electrical engineer and theoretical physicist.

== Life ==
He was born in Manchester and attended Manchester Grammar School prior to studying Electrical Engineering at Manchester College of Technology. After graduating he gained a job with GEC, first at Heywood, then Wembley.

From 1945 until 1951 he was employed as a theoretical physicist with ICI Ltd, being seconded to Bristol University for the final 4 years, lecturing under Nevill Francis Mott and Herbert Fröhlich. From 1951 onwards he lectured in Natural Philosophy at Glasgow University.

He developed the Burton–Carbrera–Frank model for adatoms and crystal growth, with Nicolás Cabrera and Frederick Charles Frank.

He was elected a Fellow of the Royal Society of Edinburgh on 3 March 1958.

He died at his home in Milngavie near Glasgow on 30 December 1996.
