= Lyubomir Krastanov =

Bulgarian physical scientist

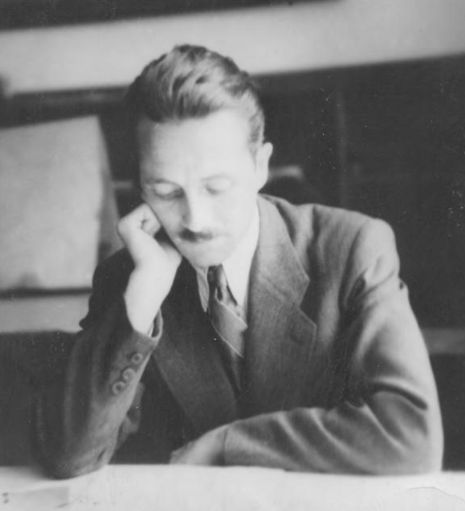
- Krastanov in Central Meteorological Institute in Sofia, 1944

Lyubomir Krastanov (Cyrillic: Любомир Кръстанов, 1908-1977) was a Bulgarian physical scientist specializing in meteorology, atmospheric physics and fundamental physics. One of the modes for growth of thin films, Stranski–Krastanov growth, is named after him and Ivan Stranski. On the 12th of June 1959 he was elected the deputy president of the Bulgarian Academy of Sciences.
