= Blas Cabrera Navarro =

Physicist at Stanford University

Blas Cabrera Navarro (born September 21, 1946, in Paris, France) is a Stanley G. Wojcicki Professor of Physics at Stanford University best known for his experiment in search of magnetic monopoles. He is the son of Spanish physicist Nicolás Cabrera and the grandson of Blas Cabrera Felipe, also a Spanish physicist.

Blas Cabrera received his B.S. from the University of Virginia in 1968 and in 1975 got his Ph.D. from Stanford University after defending his thesis The Use of Superconducting Shields for Generating Ultra Low Magnetic Field Regions and Several Related Experiments, under advisors William M. Fairbank and William O. Hamilton.

On the night of February 14, 1982, his detector recorded an event which had the perfect signature hypothesized for a magnetic monopole. After he published his discovery, a number of similar detectors were built by various research groups, and Cabrera's laboratory itself received a large grant to build an improved detector. However, no similar event has been recorded since, and his research group has since dropped the search. He is now a leader of the Cryogenic Dark Matter Search experiment.

In 1995, Cabrera was elected as a fellow of the American Physical Society.
