= Nicolás Cabrera (physicist) =

Spanish physicist (1913–1989)

Nicolás Cabrera Sánchez (1913–1989), was a Spanish physicist and professor of the Autonomous University of Madrid, who did important work on the theories of crystals and the oxidisation of metals. He is known for the development of the Burton–Cabrera–Frank theory for crystal growth. He spent many years in exile from Spain during the Francoist State.

== Life ==
Nicolás Cabrera was born in Madrid in 1913, son of another famous Spanish physicist Blas Cabrera and the father of American physicist Blas Cabrera Navarro.

Nicolás Cabrera completed his undergraduate studies in the University of Madrid in 1935. He later worked at the Edificio Rockefeller in Madrid. He published his first paper on magnetism of rare-earth elements, co-authored with his father and Salvador Velayos.

Due to the Spanish Civil War, he and his family moved to Paris in 1938. There he completed his PhD thesis in 1944, titled "Perturbation of boundary conditions" (Perturbation des conditions aux limites). His doctoral advisors were Louis de Broglie and Léon Brillouin. He remained in Paris until 1952. He later became a postdoctoral researcher in the H. H. Wills Physics Laboratory in the University of Bristol, working with Nevill Mott. Cabrera and Mott worked on the quantum theory of oxidation of metals, published in 1949. Two years later, he published together with Keith Burton and Charles Frank, what became known as the Burton–Cabrera–Frank (BCF) theory for crystal growth.

In 1952, he returned to Paris to work at the International Bureau of Weights and Measures. The same year, Cabrera moved to work in the department of physics in the University of Virginia until 1968. In 1967, Cabrera did a leave for a year as visiting professor of the Central University of Venezuela.

In 1971, he returned to Spain, founding the physics department and working as professor at the Autonomous University of Madrid (UAM). For a time, Javier Solana, whom he met at the University of Virginia, was his assistant in Madrid.

He died in Madrid in 1989.

== Honors ==
The Nicolás Cabrera Institute, founded in 1989 in the UAM, is named after him.
