= Earth and Man National Museum =

Mineralogical museum in Sofia, Bulgaria

- Национален музей „Земята и хората“
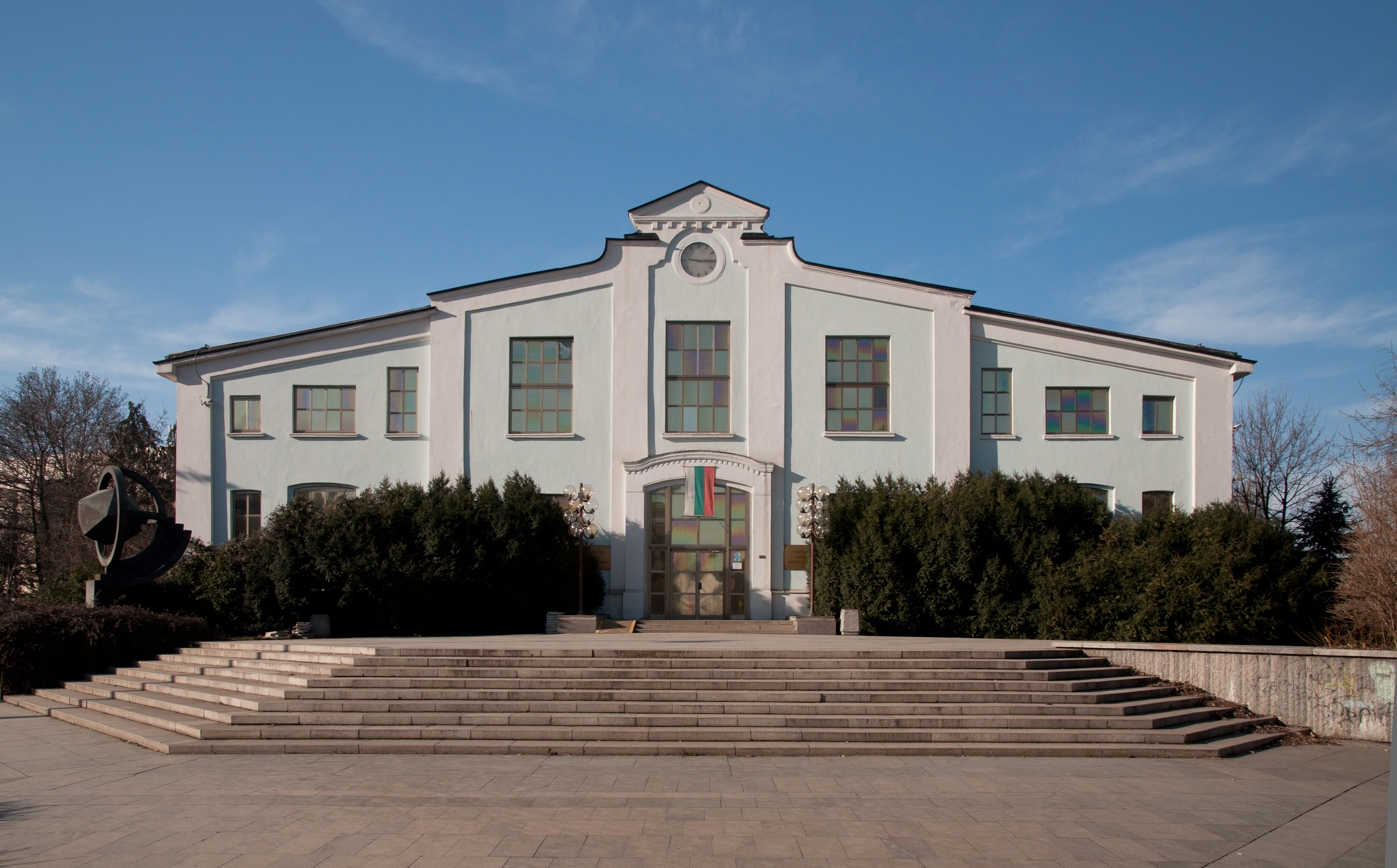
- The main entrance to the Earth and Man museum
- Established: 30 December 1985
- Location: Sofia
- Coordinates: 42°40′47″N 23°19′14″E
- Website: www.earthandman.org/language/en/front/

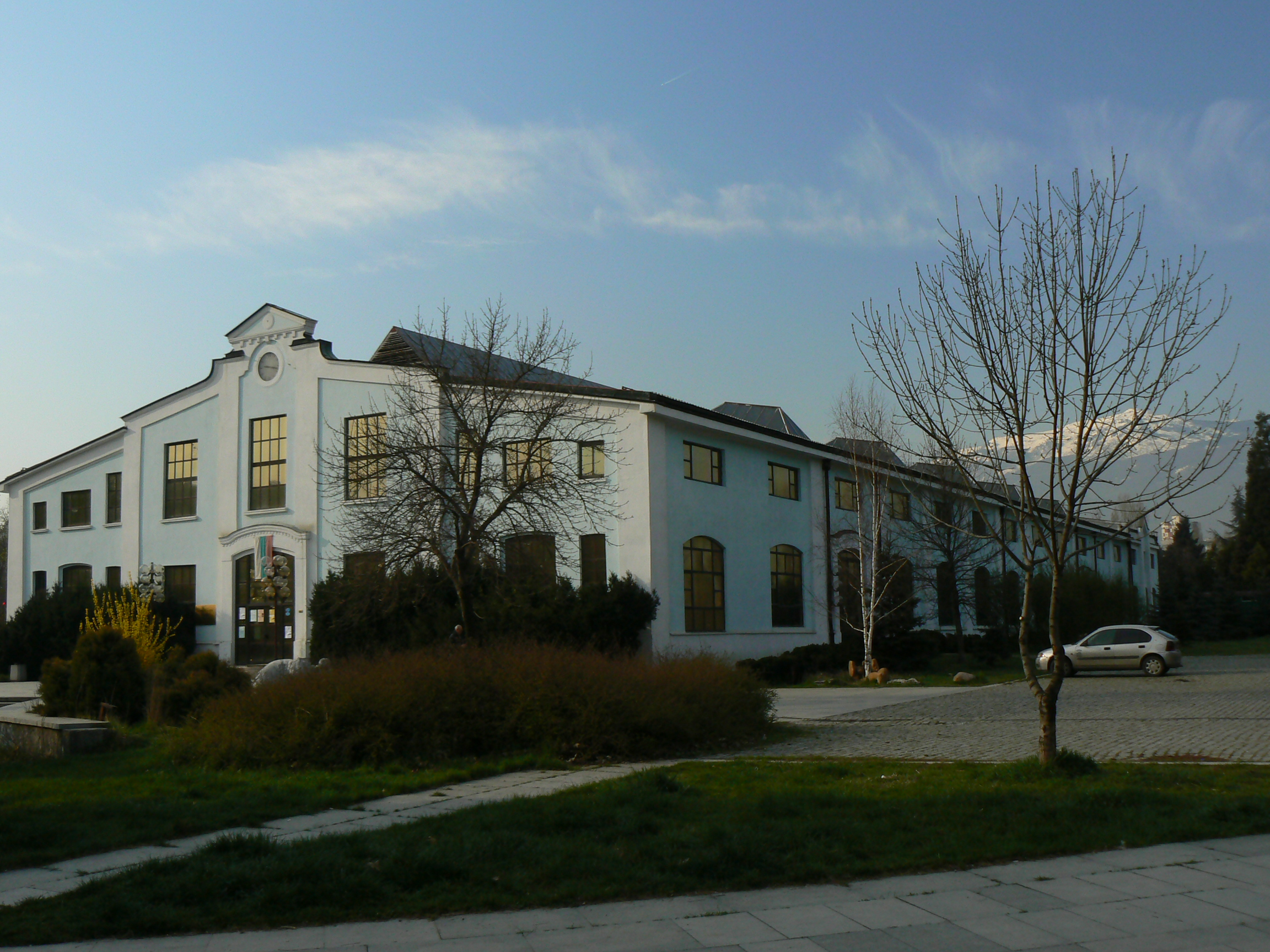
The museum with Vitosha in the background

The Earth and Man National Museum (Bulgarian: Национален музей „Земята и хората“, romanized Natsionalen muzey „Zemyata i horata“) is a mineralogical museum in the centre of Sofia, the capital of Bulgaria.

It's one of the biggest mineralogical museums in the world. It was founded on 1 January 1986 and opened for visitors on 19 June 1987. The museum is situated in a reconstructed and adapted historic building with an area of 4,000 square meters (43056 square feet) constructed in the end of the 19th century (1896–1898). It has a number of exhibition halls, stock premises, laboratories, a video room and a conference room. Its collection covers 40% of all known naturally occurring minerals as well as man-made ceramics prepared by Bulgarian scientists.

Apart from its permanent expositions related to mineral diversity, the museum also often hosts exhibitions connected with various other topics as well as concerts of chamber music.

== Gallery ==
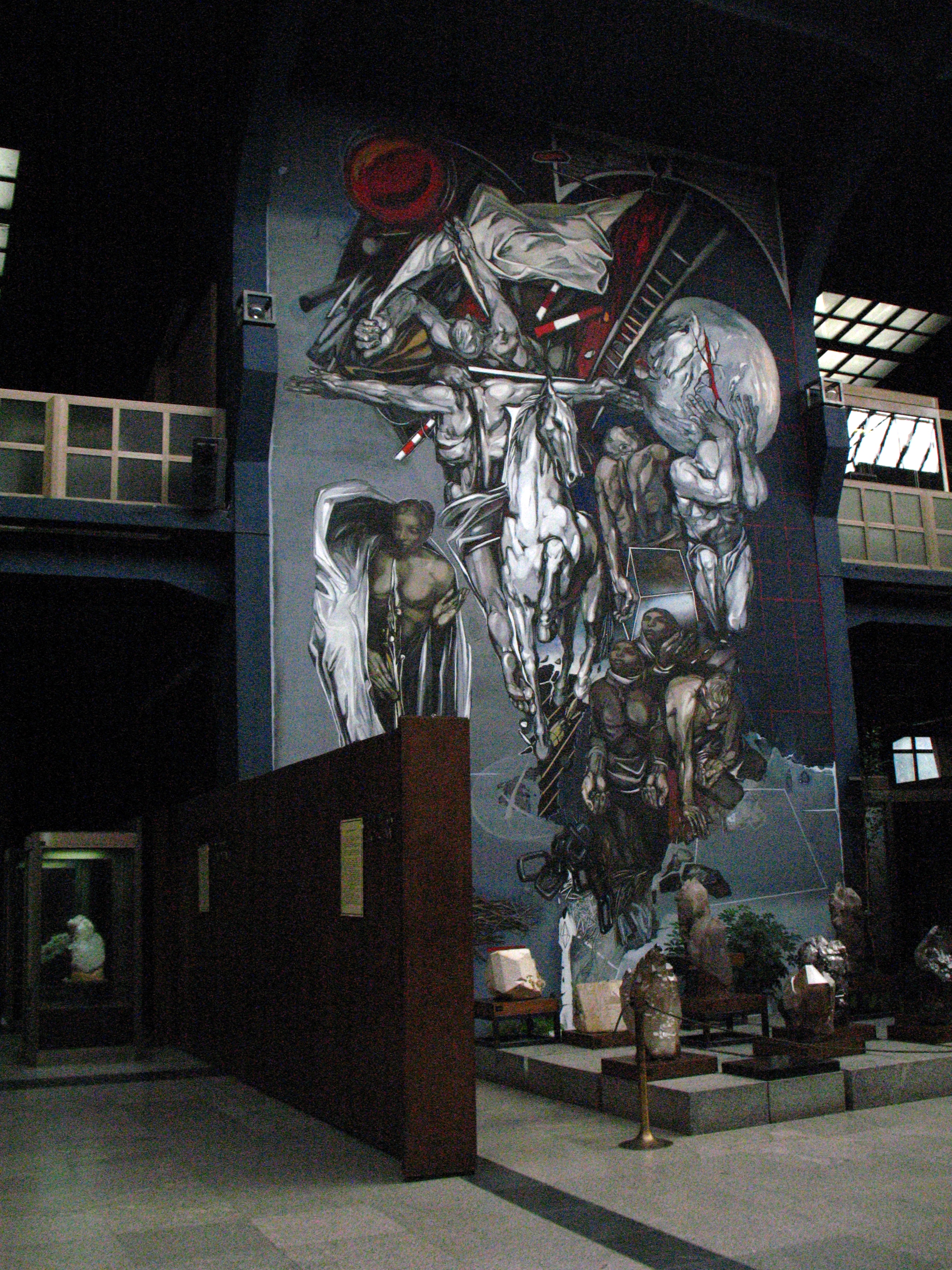
Large painting on left

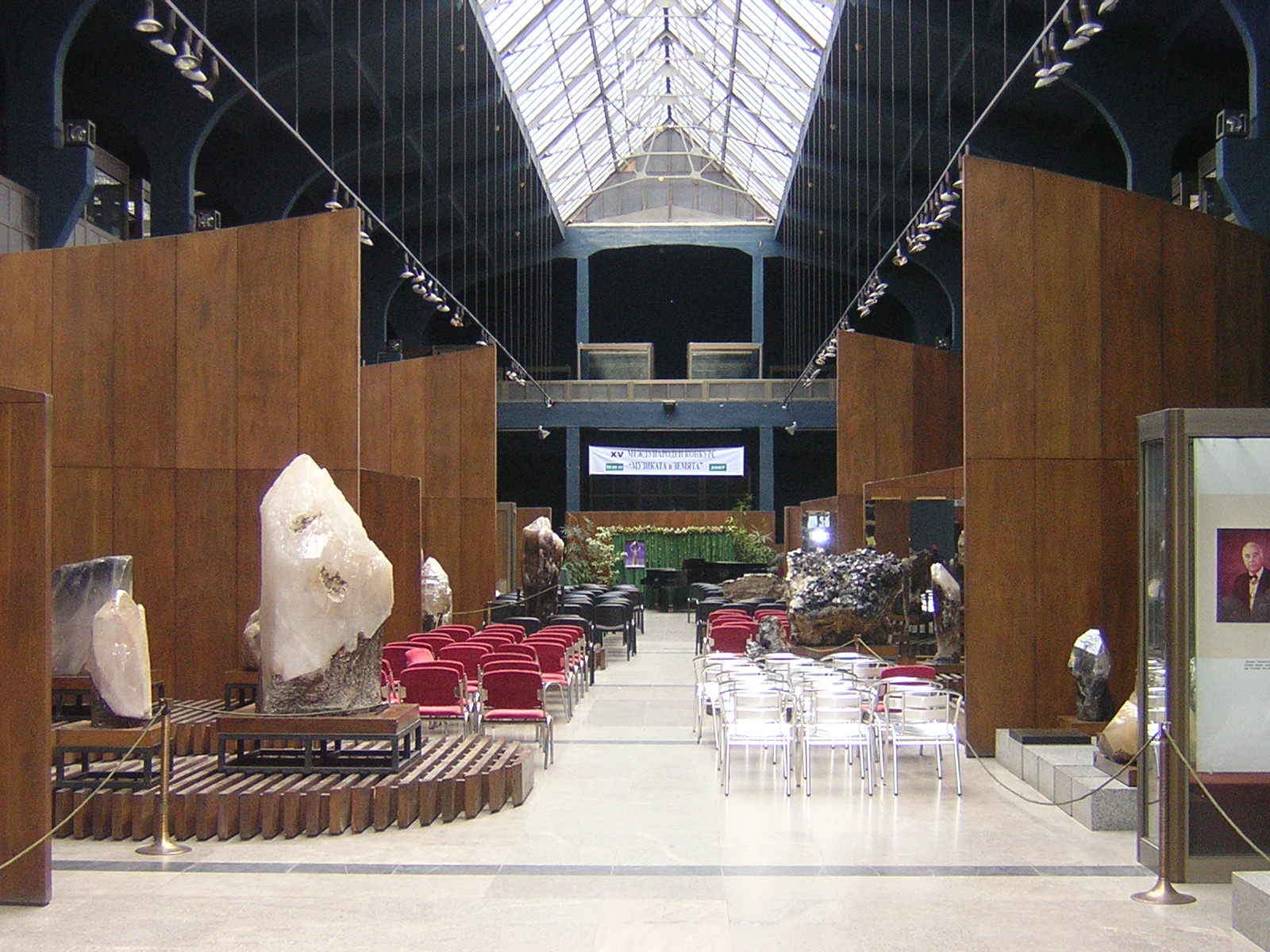
Main hall inside museum

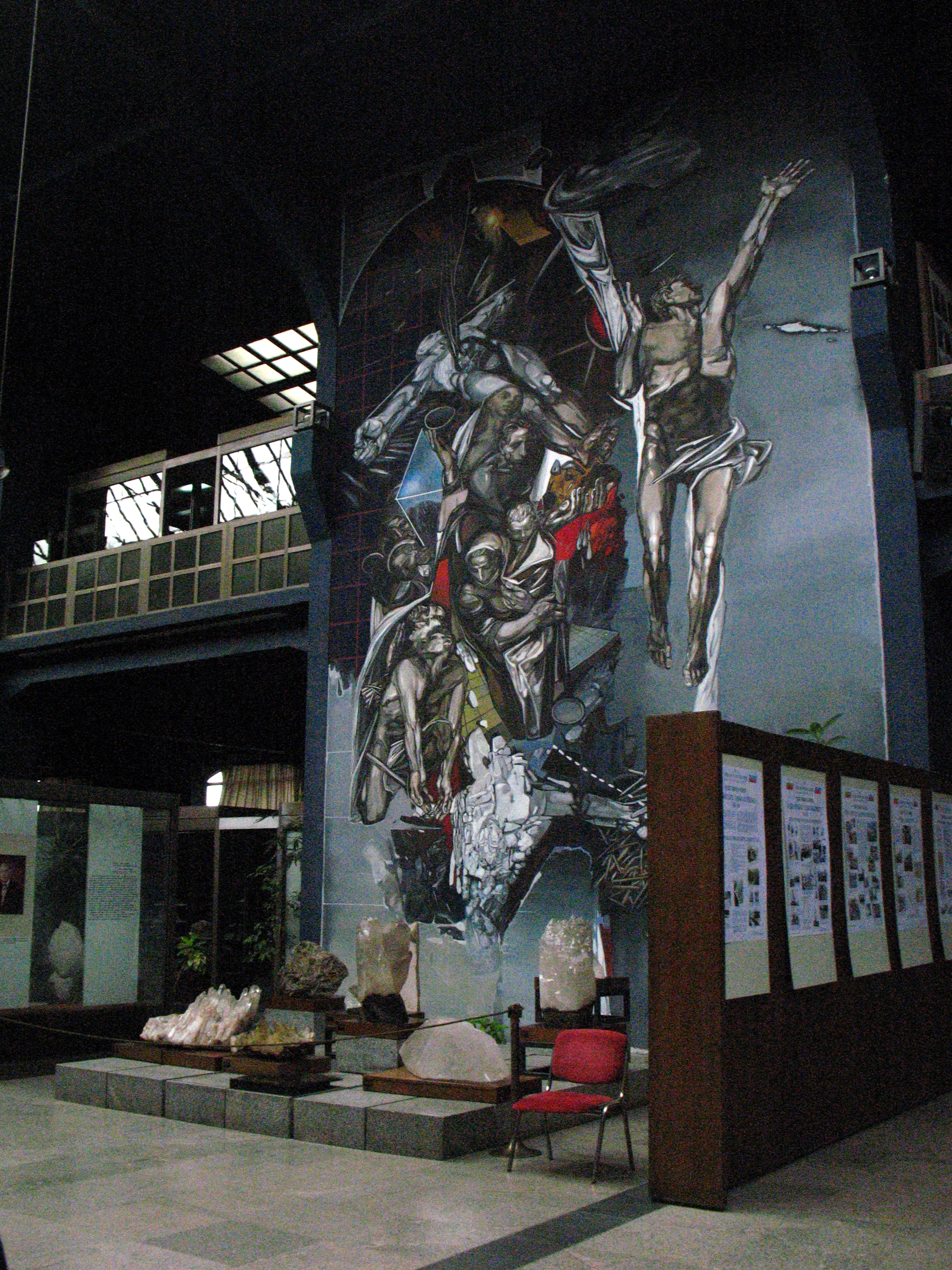
Large painting on right

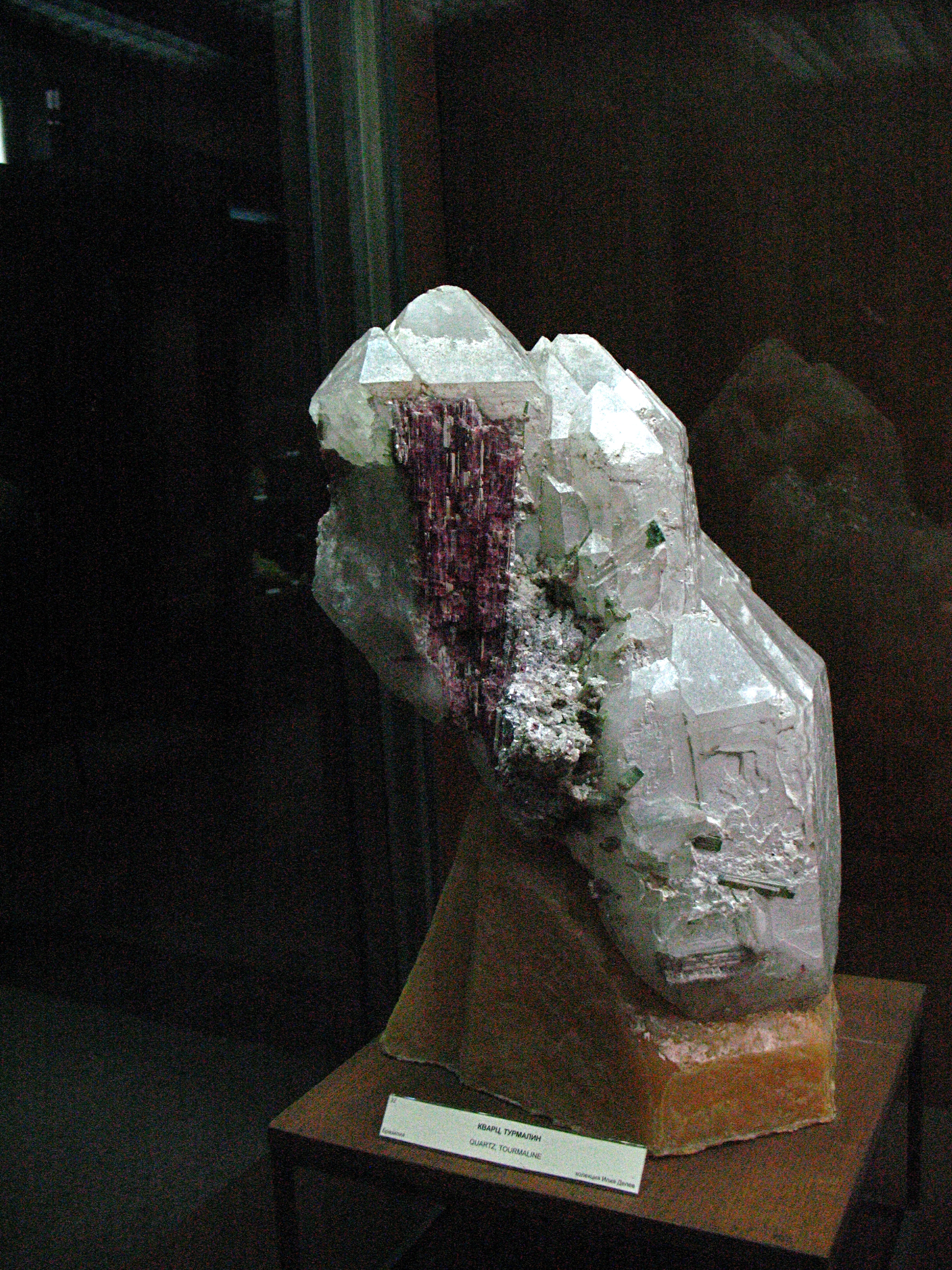
Quartz, tourmaline

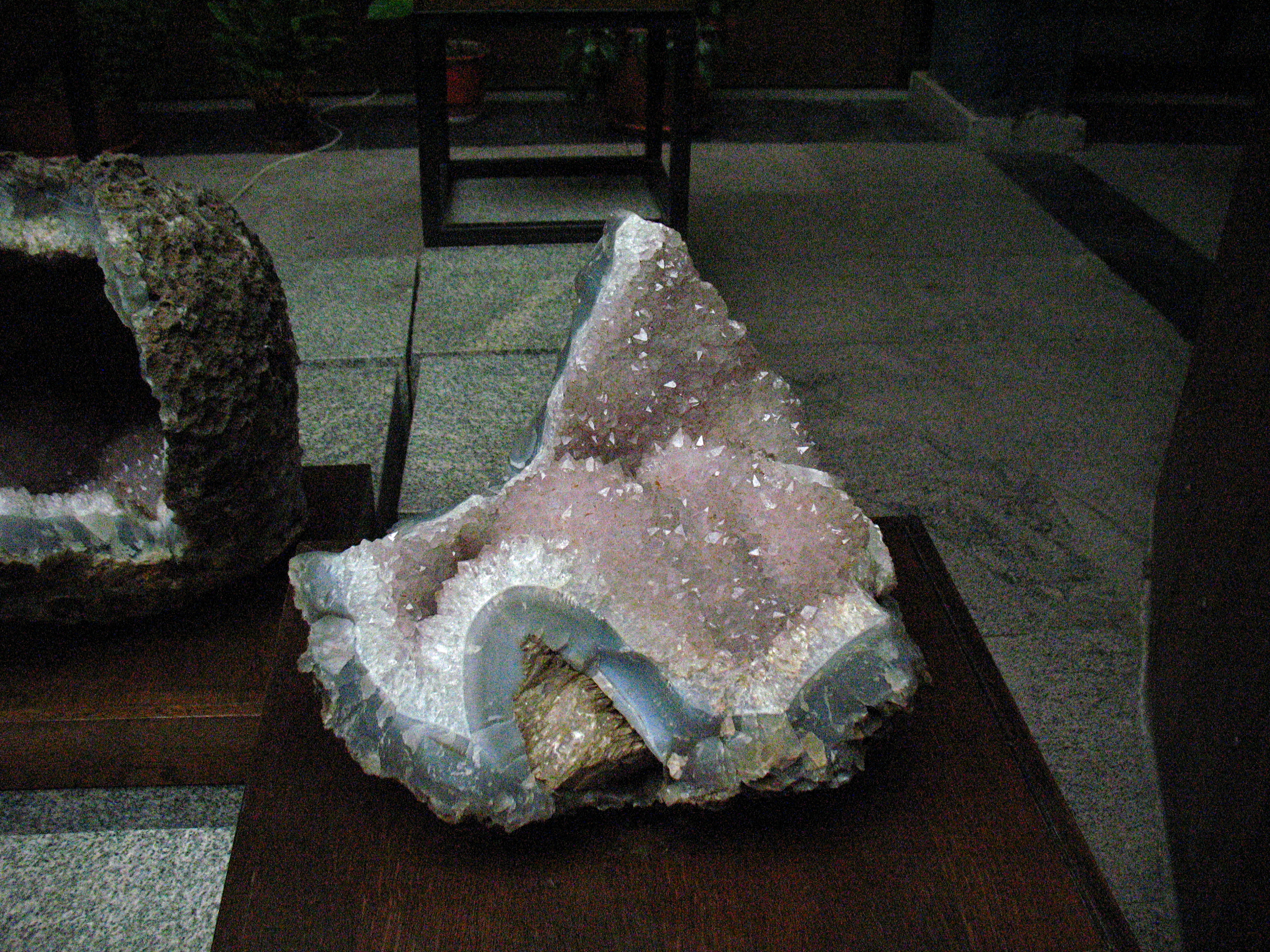
Amethyst geode

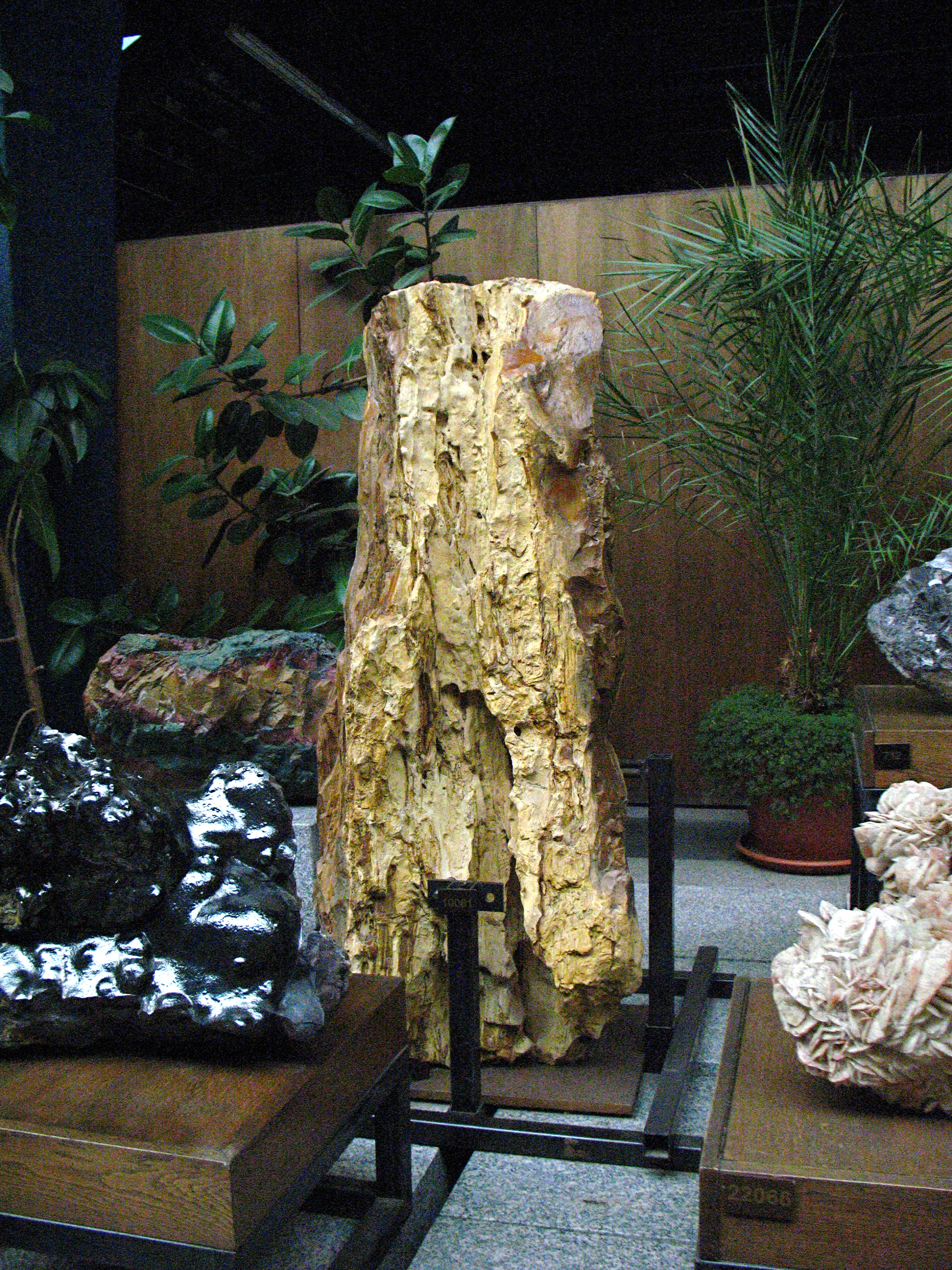
Petrified tree

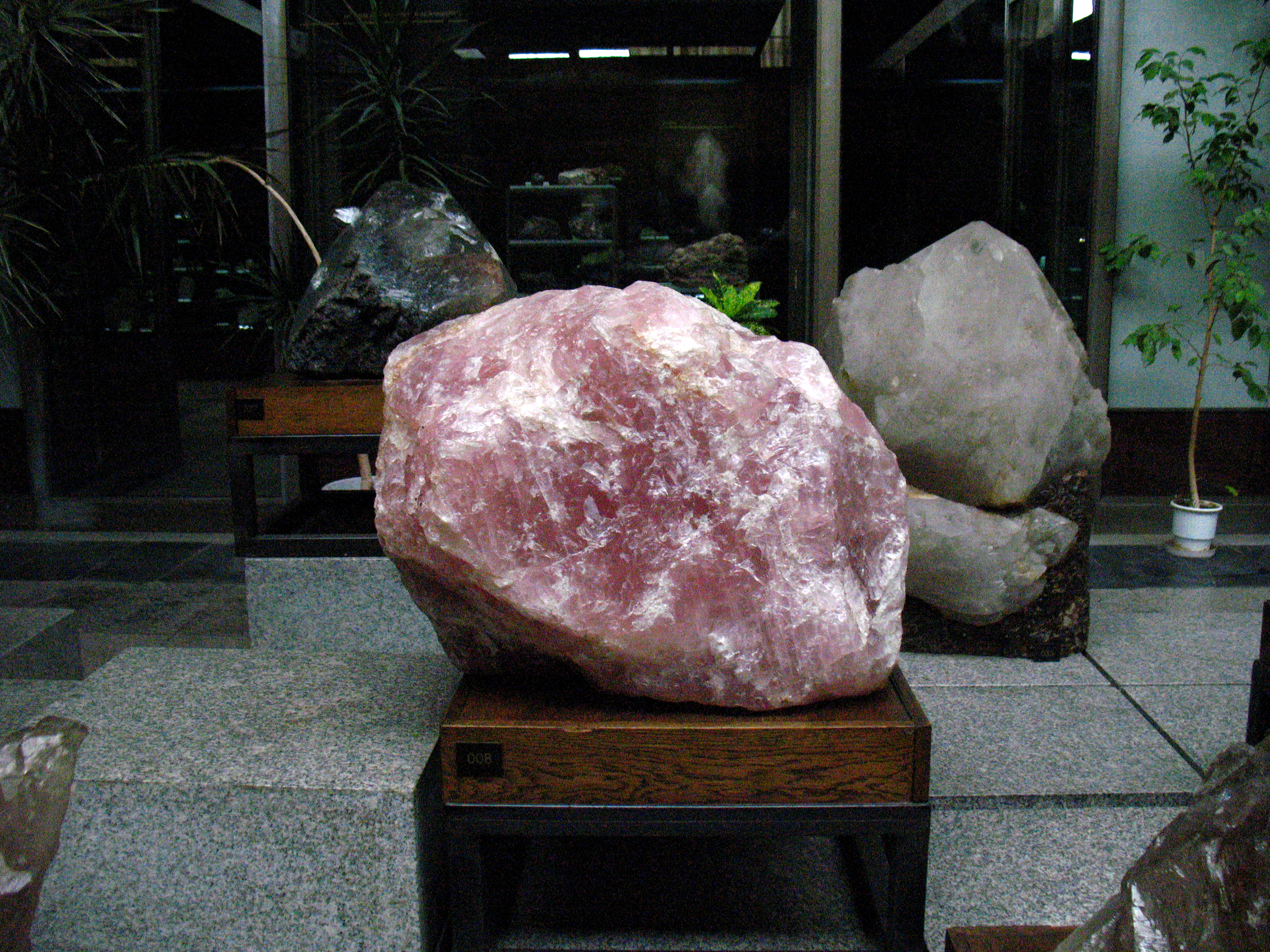
Rose quartz

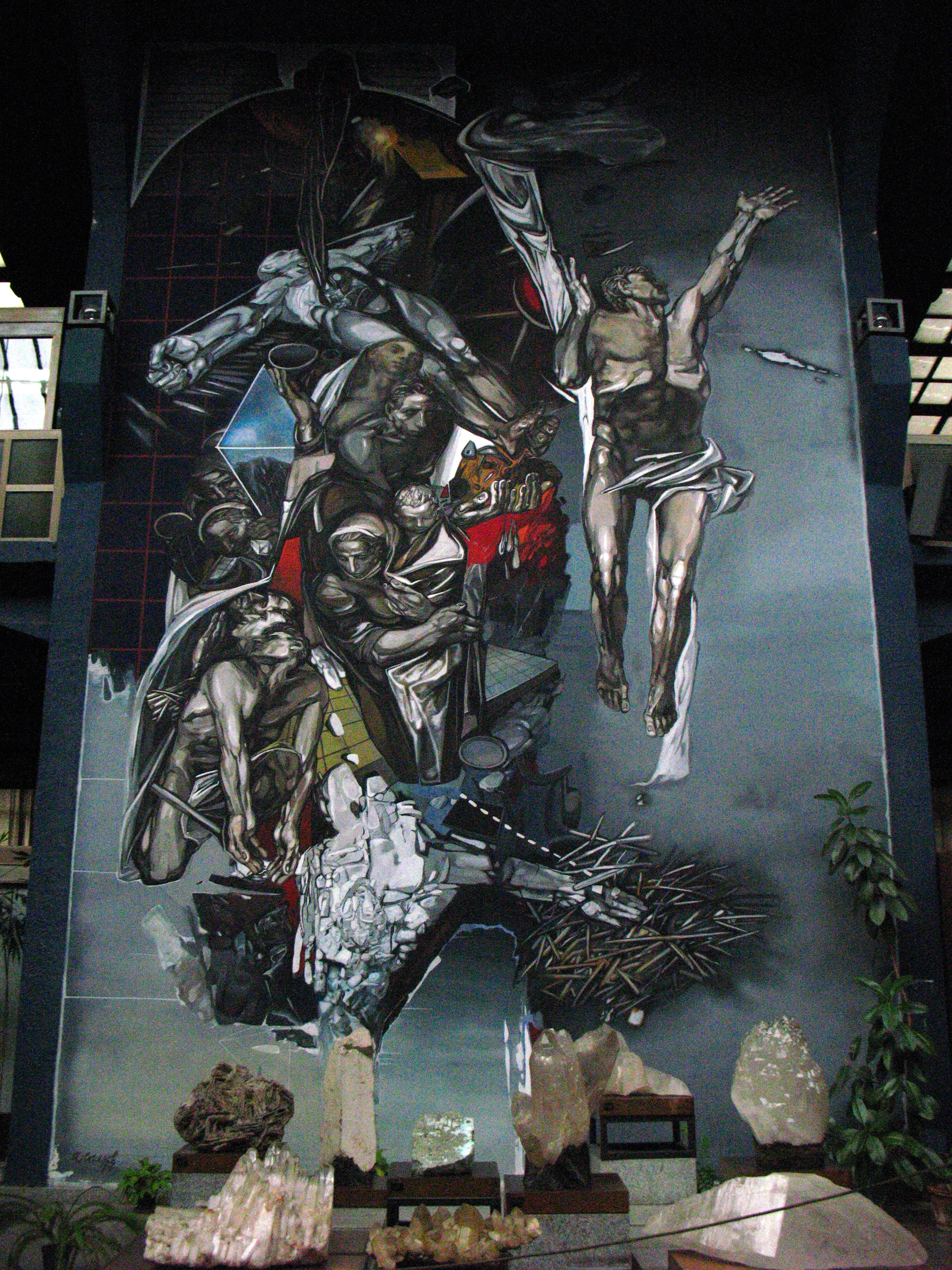
Large painting on right

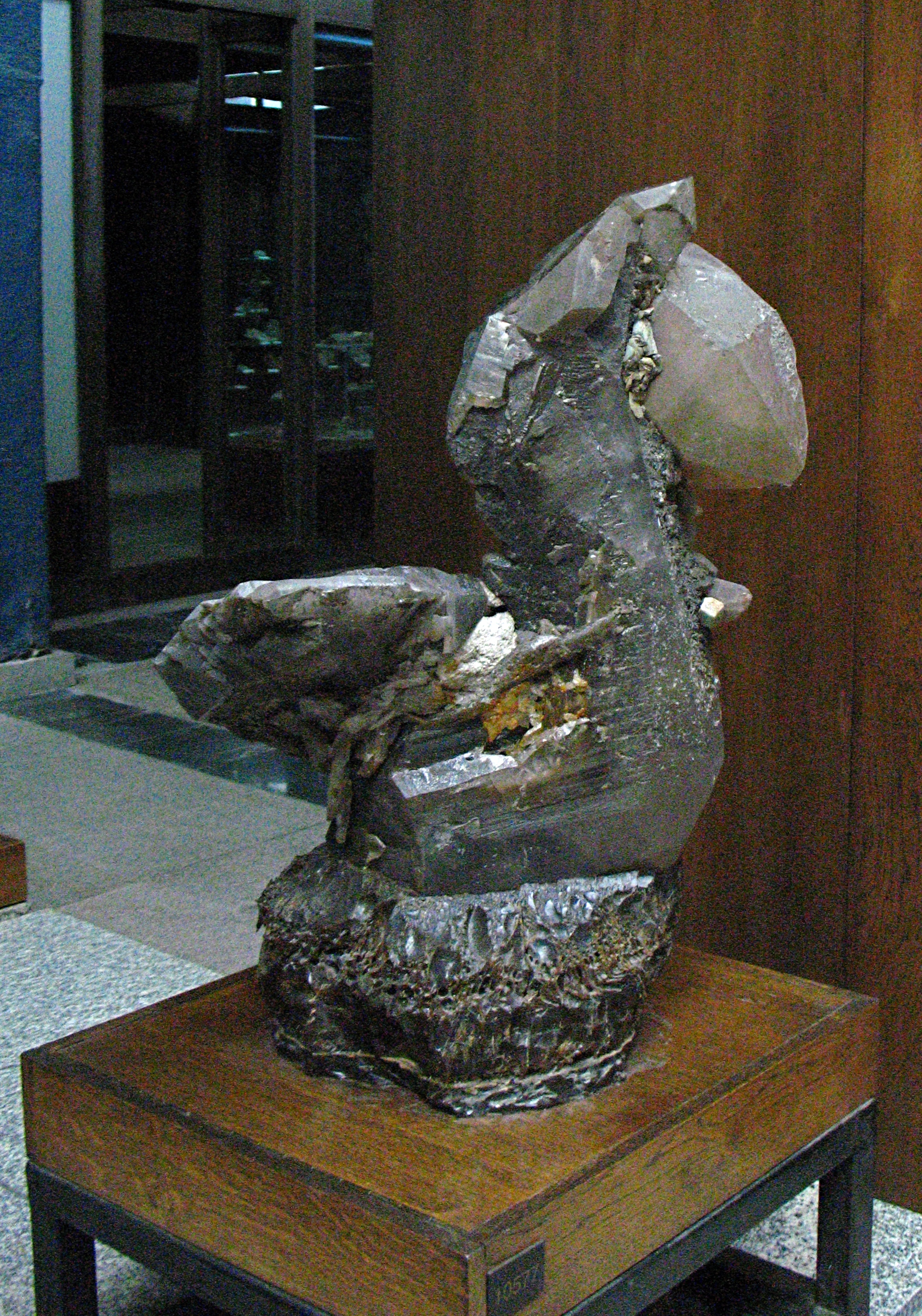
„Duckling“

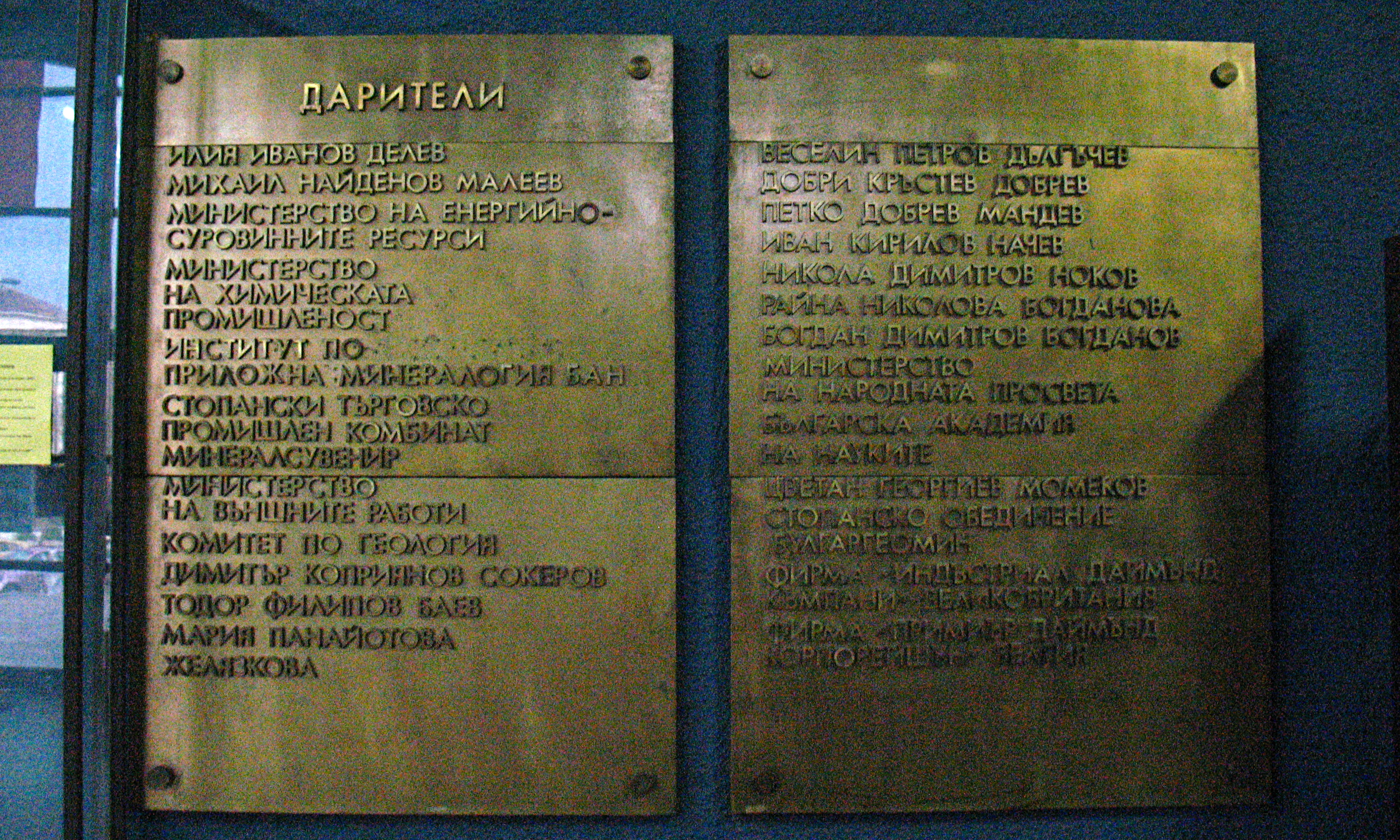
Benefactors

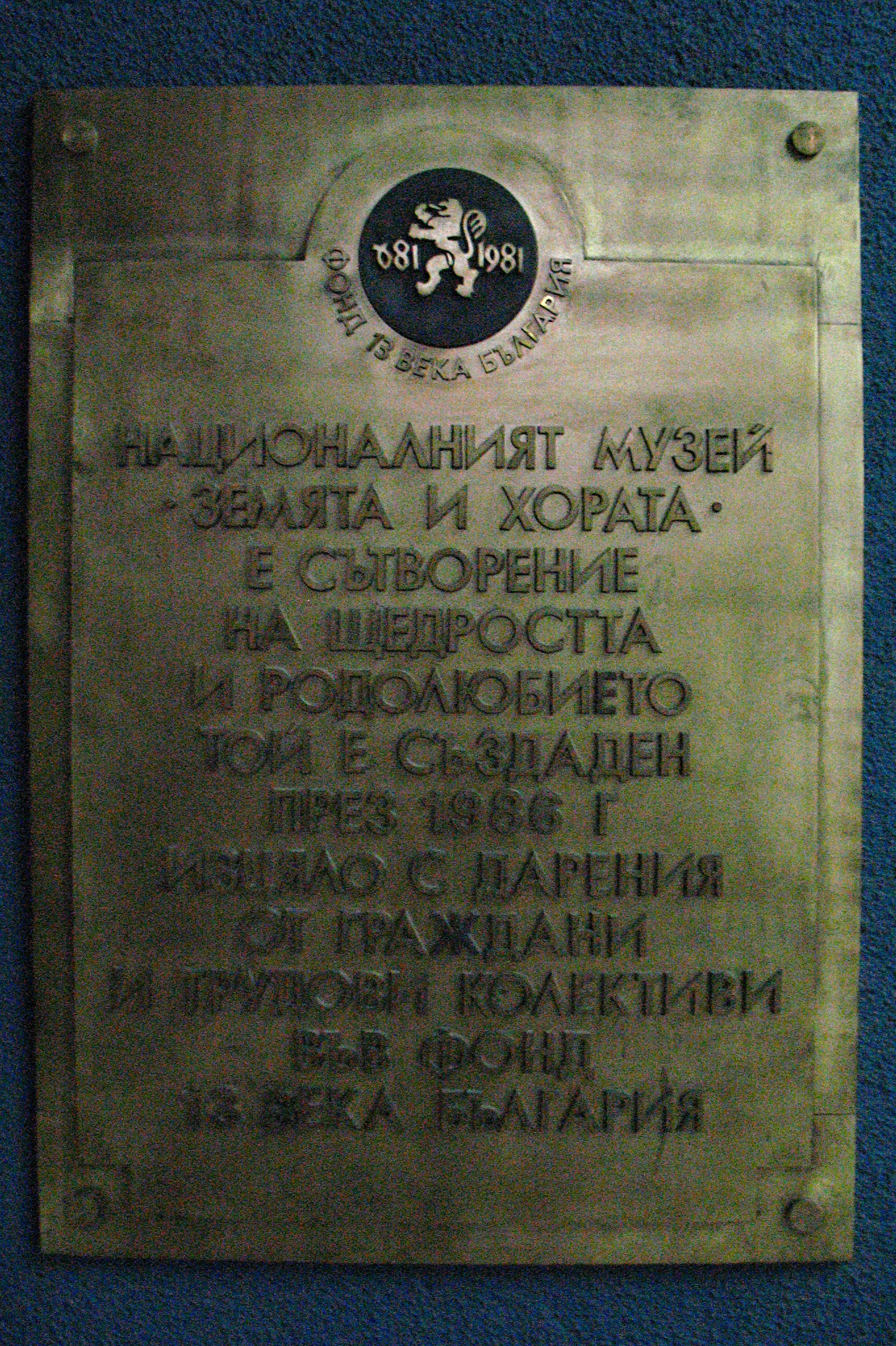
National Fund „13 Centuries of Bulgaria“
