= Wetting layer =

A wetting layer is an monolayer of atoms that is epitaxially grown on a flat surface. The atoms forming the wetting layer can be semimetallic elements/compounds or metallic alloys (for thin films). Wetting layers form when depositing a lattice-mismatched material on a crystalline substrate. This article refers to the wetting layer connected to the growth of self-assembled quantum dots (e.g. InAs on GaAs). These quantum dots form on top of the wetting layer. The wetting layer can influence the states of the quantum dot for applications in quantum information processing and quantum computation.

== Process ==
The wetting layer is epitaxially grown on a surface using molecular beam epitaxy (MBE). The temperatures required for wetting layer growth typically range from 400-500 degrees Celsius. When a material A is deposited on a surface of a lattice-mismatched material B, the first atomic layer of material A often adopts the lattice constant of B. This mono-layer of material A is called the wetting layer. When the thickness of layer A increases further, it becomes energetically unfavorable for material A to keep the lattice constant of B. Due to the high strain of layer A, additional atoms group together once a certain critical thickness of layer A is reached. This island formation reduces the elastic energy. Overgrown with material B, the wetting layer forms a quantum well in case material A has a lower bandgap than B. In this case, the formed islands are quantum dots. Further annealing can be used to modify the physical properties of the wetting layer/quantum dot .

== Properties ==
The wetting layer is a close-to mono-atomic layer with a thickness of typically 0.5 nanometers. The electronic properties of the quantum dot can change as a result of the wetting layer. Also, the strain of the quantum dot can change due to the wetting layer.
