= Ivan Stranski =

Bulgarian chemist (1897–1979)

Ivan Nikolov Stranski
- Иван Николов Странски
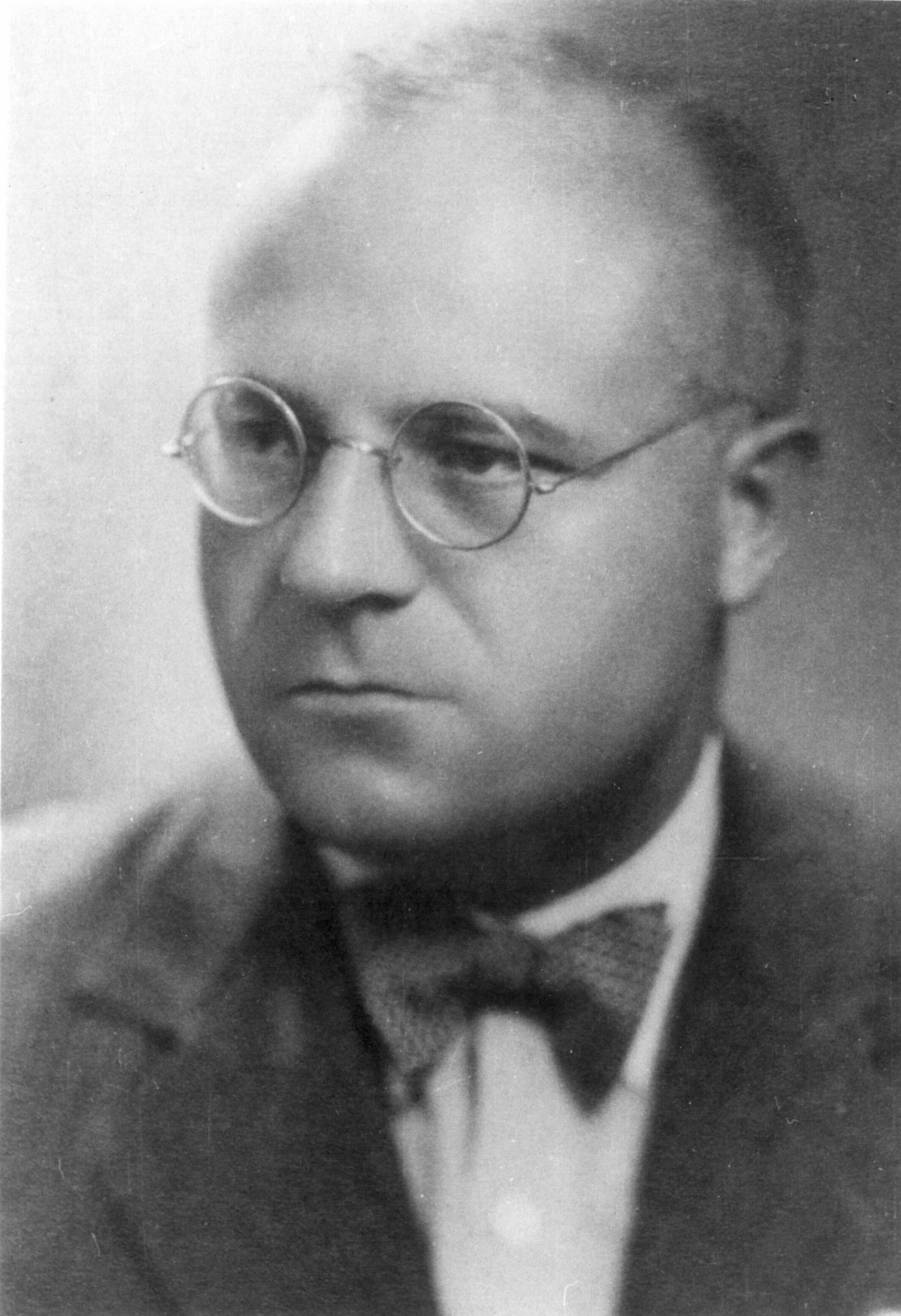
- Stranski in 1940
- Born: 2 January 1897 (N.S.); Sofia, Principality of Bulgaria
- Died: 19 June 1979 (aged 82); Sofia, People's Republic of Bulgaria
- Resting place: Waldfriedhof Dahlem, Berlin, Germany
- Other name: Iwan Nikolow Stranski (German)
- Citizenship: Kingdom of Bulgaria and later Federal Republic of Germany
- Education: University of Vienna; University of Sofia; University of Berlin
- Known for: Stranski–Krastanov growth; Kossel–Stranski model
- Parents: Nikola Stranski (father); Maria Krohn (mother)
- Awards: August Wilhelm von Hofmann Silver Medal of GDCh (1939); Cyril and Methodius Prize for Science of BAN (1940); Great Cross of Merit of the Order of Merit of West Germany (1964)
- Scientific career
- Fields: Physical Chemistry, Crystal growth
- Workplaces: University of Sofia; Technische Universität Berlin; Ural Institute of Physics and Mechanics; Technische Hochschule Breslau; Kaiser Wilhelm Institute for Physical Chemistry and Electrochemistry; Fritz Haber Institute
- Thesis: Beiträge zur Röntgenspektralanalyse (1925)
- Doctoral advisor: Paul Günther

Ivan Nikolov Stranski (Bulgarian: Иван Николов Странски; German: Iwan Nikolow Stranski; 2 January [O.S. 21 December ] 1897 – 19 June 1979) was a Bulgarian and later a German physical chemist who is considered the father of crystal growth research.

He was the founder of the Bulgarian school of physical chemistry, heading the departments of physical chemistry at Sofia University and later at Technische Hochschule Berlin (today Technische Universität Berlin), of which he was also rector. The Stranski–Krastanov growth and Kossel–Stranski model are some of Stranski's contributions which bear his name.

== Biography ==
=== Early life and studies ===
Ivan Stranski was born on 21 December 1896 O.S. (2 January 1897 N.S.) in Sofia, the capital of the Principality of Bulgaria, the third child of Nikola Stranski (1854 - 1910), pharmacist to the royal court, and his wife Maria Krohn, a Baltic German. Ever since his childhood he suffered from bone tuberculosis, an incurable disease at the time. Stranski finished the First Sofia High School for Boys. Seeking ways to fight the illness, Stranski decided to study medicine, though he returned to Bulgaria disappointed after a year of studies in Vienna. He graduated from Sofia University in 1922, majoring in chemistry, and went to the Friedrich Wilhelm University of Berlin for further studies. There, in 1925, he acquired his Dr. phil. under Paul Günther with a dissertation on X-ray spectroscopy.

=== International academic career ===
Following his doctoral studies, Stranski joined Sofia University's newly established Department of Physical Chemistry of the Faculty of Physics and Mathematics in 1925 as a reader, becoming the first reader of physical chemistry in the country. By 1929, he was promoted to associate professor and by 1937 he was a regular professor at Sofia University. Stranski attracted prominent scientists such as Rostislaw Kaischew and Lyubomir Krastanov to the department.

In 1930, Ivan Stranski received a Rockefeller scholarship and along with Kaischew was invited to Technische Hochschule Berlin, where he collaborated with prominent physical chemist Max Volmer. The 1930s saw the publishing of several important articles which Stranski co-authored with Kaischew and Krastanov, such as the 1939 discovery of Stranski–Krastanov growth. In 1935–1936 he was head of department at the Ural Institute of Physics and Mechanics in Sverdlovsk in the Soviet Union. In 1941, Stranski was invited by Walther Kossel to conduct research in Technische Hochschule Breslau. He put forth his kinetic theory of crystal growth, which became known as the Kossel–Stranski model—Kossel independently proposed the same model.

=== Return to Berlin and later years ===
With the advance of the Red Army, Stranski returned to Berlin to work at the Kaiser Wilhelm Institute for Physical Chemistry and Electrochemistry. As Nazi Germany surrendered, Volmer was taken by force to the Soviet Union and Stranski took his place as the director of studies at Technische Hochschule Berlin's Department of Physical Chemistry. Despite the heavy damage caused by Allied bombing, not without Stranski's assistance the Technische Hochschule Berlin, then renamed Technische Universität Berlin was among the few that opened for the 1945 academic year. In 1948–1949, Stranski was the dean of the Faculty of General and Engineering Sciences. In 1951–1953, Stranski was rector of the university; he had also previously held the position of vice rector. In 1953, he became deputy director of the Fritz Haber Institute. Until 1963, Stranski taught at the Free University of Berlin.

After the Bulgarian coup d'état of 1944 and the installment of a communist government, Stranski was accused of links to the preceding pro-fascist régime and removed from the department that he established. It was not until the 1960s that he was re-accepted as a foreign member of the Bulgarian Academy of Sciences and he would only return to Bulgaria from West Berlin in 1967. He died in Sofia in 1979, but was buried in Berlin.

== Honours and awards ==
In 1965, Stranski was nominated for the Nobel Prize in Chemistry by Georg-Maria Schwab, one of the few Bulgarians to be nominated for a Nobel in the sciences.

Throughout his life, he was honoured with awards such as the German Chemical Society's August Wilhelm von Hofmann Silver Medal (1939), the Bulgarian Academy of Sciences Cyril and Methodius Prize for Science (1940), the Great Cross of Merit of West Germany's Order of Merit, as well as honorary doctorates from the University of Breslau (1940) and the Free University of Berlin (1954). Stranski was also member of the Göttingen Academy of Sciences (1939), Royal Society of Arts and Sciences in Gothenburg (1940), Bavarian Academy of Sciences (1959), New York Academy of Sciences, and the German Academy of Sciences Leopoldina (1966).

Two modern institutes bear his name: the Stranski Laboratory for Physical und Theoretical Chemistry (Stranski-Laboratorium für Physikalische und Theoretische Chemie; called Iwan N.-Stranski-Institut from 1967 to 2001) of Technische Universität Berlin, and the Stranski Institute of Metallurgy (I.-N.-Stranski-Institut für Metallurgie) in Oberhausen.

In 1957, a new mineral, CuZn_{2}(AsO_{4})_{2}, was discovered by Karl Hugo Strunz. In 1960, he named it after Stranski, stranskiit, in recognition of Stranski's role as "father of crystal growth research".

A street in Sofia, Bulgaria is also named after Ivan Stranski.

== Selected bibliography ==
- Stranski, Iwan (1924). "Über die Gleichrichterwirkung der Kontaktdetektoren". Zeitschrift für Physikalische Chemie (in German). 113U (1): 131–144. doi:10.1515/zpch-1924-11310.
- Странски, Иван (1928). "Върху растежа на кристалите". Годишник на Софийския университет. Физико-математически факултет. Книга 2 и 3 - Химия и Естествени науки / Annuaire de l'Université de Sofia. Faculté Physico-mathématique. Livre 2 et 3 - Chimie et Sciences naturelles (in Bulgarian and German). 24 (2–3): 297–315.
- Stranski, I. N. (1928). "Zur Theorie des Kristallwachstums". Zeitschrift für Physikalische Chemie (in German). 136U (136): 259–278. doi:10.1515/zpch-1928-13620.
- Stranski, I. N.; Kaischew, R. (1931). "Gleichgewichtsformen homöopolarer Kristalle". Zeitschrift für Physikalische Chemie (in German). 78 (1–6): 373–385. doi:10.1524/zkri.1931.78.1.373.
- Stranski, I. N.; D. Totomanow (1932). "Die Ostwald'sche Stufenregel". Naturwissenschaften (in German). 20 (905): 905. doi:10.1007/BF01504912.
- Kaischew, R.; Stranski, I. N. (1934). "Zur Theorie der linearen Kristallisationsgeschwindigkeit". Zeitschrift für Physikalische Chemie (in German). 170A (1): 295–299. doi:10.1515/zpch-1934-17027.
- I. N. Stranski, L. Krastanov, Zur Theorie der orientierten Ausscheidung von Ionenkristallen aufeinander, Sitzungsber. d. Akad. d. Wissensch. Wien, Math.-naturw. Kl. Abt. IIb, 146, 797 (1938)
- Bradistilov, G.; Stranski, I. (1941). "Über die Gleichgewichtsform des Fluoritkristalls". Zeitschrift für Kristallographie (in German). 103 (1–6): 1–29. doi:10.1524/zkri.1941.103.1.1.
- Lacmann, R.; Stranski, I. (May 1972). "The Growth of Snow Crystals". Journal of Crystal Growth. 13–14: 236-240. doi:10.1016/0022-0248(72)90161-3.
- Stranski, I. (May 1972). "Eine plauderei über gleichgewichtsformen von kristallen". Journal of Crystal Growth (in German). 13–14: 3-8. doi:10.1016/0022-0248(72)90053-X.

== See also ==
- Premelting
