= Charles Frank (physicist) =

British physicist (1911–1998)

Charles Frank FRS
- Born: 6 March 1911; Durban, Union of South Africa
- Died: 5 April 1998 (aged 87); Bristol, England
- Education: Lincoln College, Oxford (B.A., 1932; B.Sc., 1933; Ph.D, 1937)
- Known for: Cyclol hypothesis Disclination; Muon-catalyzed fusion Screw disclocation Burton–Cabrera–Frank model Frank partial dislocations Frank's constant Frank free energy Frank–Kasper phases Frank–Read source Frank–Van der Merwe growth
- Awards: Copley Medal (1994); Guthrie Medal (1982); Gregori Aminoff Prize (1981); Bakerian Medal (1973); Griffith Medal (1967); Holweck Medal (1963)
- Scientific career
- Fields: Theoretical physics
- Workplaces: University of Bristol

Sir Frederick Charles Frank, FRS (6 March 1911 – 5 April 1998) was a British theoretical physicist. He is best known for his work on crystal dislocations, including (with Thornton Read) the idea of the Frank–Read source of dislocations. He also proposed the cyclol reaction in the mid-1930s, and made many other contributions to solid-state physics, geophysics, and the theory of liquid crystals.

== Early life and education ==
He was born in Durban, in the Union of South Africa, although his parents returned to England soon afterwards. He was educated at Thetford Grammar School and Ipswich School and went on to study chemistry at Lincoln College, Oxford, gaining a doctorate at the university's Engineering Laboratory.

== Career ==
Prior to World War II, he worked as a physicist in Berlin and as a colloid chemist in Cambridge. During World War II he joined the Chemical Defence Experimental Station at Porton Down, Wiltshire, but in 1940 was transferred to the Air Ministry's Assistant Directorate of Intelligence (Science) and spent the rest of the war with the Air Ministry. Due to his work he was made Officer of the Most Excellent Order of the British Empire in 1946.

After the war he moved to the University of Bristol Physics Department to do research in solid state physics, but switched to research on crystal dislocation. His work with Keith Burton and Nicolás Cabrera was to demonstrate the role dislocations played in the growth of crystals.

Apart from crystal defects, his wide-ranging research interests at Bristol included the mechanical properties of polymers, the theory of liquid crystals, the mechanics of the interior of the Earth, and the origin of biological homochirality.

He was appointed Reader in 1951, Melville Wills Professor in 1954 and Henry Overton Wills Professor and Director of the H.H. Wills Physics Laboratory in 1969. He retired in 1976 but remained active in attending conferences, writing papers and corresponding with colleagues well into the 1990s. He edited the Farm Hall Transcripts from Operation Epsilon well into his eighties.

== Honours and awards ==
Frank was elected Fellow of the Royal Society in 1954, delivering the Bakerian Lecture in 1973. He was knighted in 1977. He was also awarded honorary degrees by seven universities.

In 1963, he won the Fernand Holweck Medal and Prize.

In 1967, he was awarded the A. A. Griffith Medal and Prize. He was also a member of the Materials Science Club Awards Sub-Committee which selected the Griffith medallist for 1972 (L. R. G. Treloar).

In 1994, he was awarded the Royal Society's Copley Medal, its highest honour, "in recognition of his fundamental contribution to the theory of crystal morphology, in particular to the source of dislocations and their consequences in interfaces and crystal growth; to fundamental understanding of liquid crystals and the concept of disclination; and to the extension of crystallinity concepts to aperiodic crystals."

== Personal life ==
He married Maita Asche in 1940.
