= LaVonne =

LaVonne (also seen as Lavonne or LaVonna) is a name, mostly used as a feminine name in the United States, though variants like Lavon and LaVaughn are used more broadly. American First Lady Michelle Obama's middle name is LaVaughn; it was her paternal grandmother's first name. Other notable bearers of the name include:

== People ==
- Lavonne J. Adams, American poet
- La Vaughn Belle (born 1974), Caribbean-American artist
- LaVonne Bergstrom (1928–2001), American otolaryngologist
- A. Lavonne Brown Ruoff (born 1930), American writer
- LaVonne Griffin-Valade (born 1950s), American politician
- LaVonne Idlette (born 1985), American athlete
- LaVaughn Macon (born 1987), American football player
- LaVonna Martin (born 1966), American athlete
- LaVaughn Robinson (1927–2008), American choreographer
- LaVonne Salleé (born 1946), American artist
- Mélange Lavonne, American rapper

== Other uses ==
- 1401 Lavonne, a minor planet, named for the granddaughter of astronomer Maud Worcester Makemson
- LaVaughn, a teenaged girl character in Make Lemonade (1993), a novel by Virginia Euwer Wolff

== See also ==
- Levon (name)
- LaVon (given name)
