= Leon (given name) =

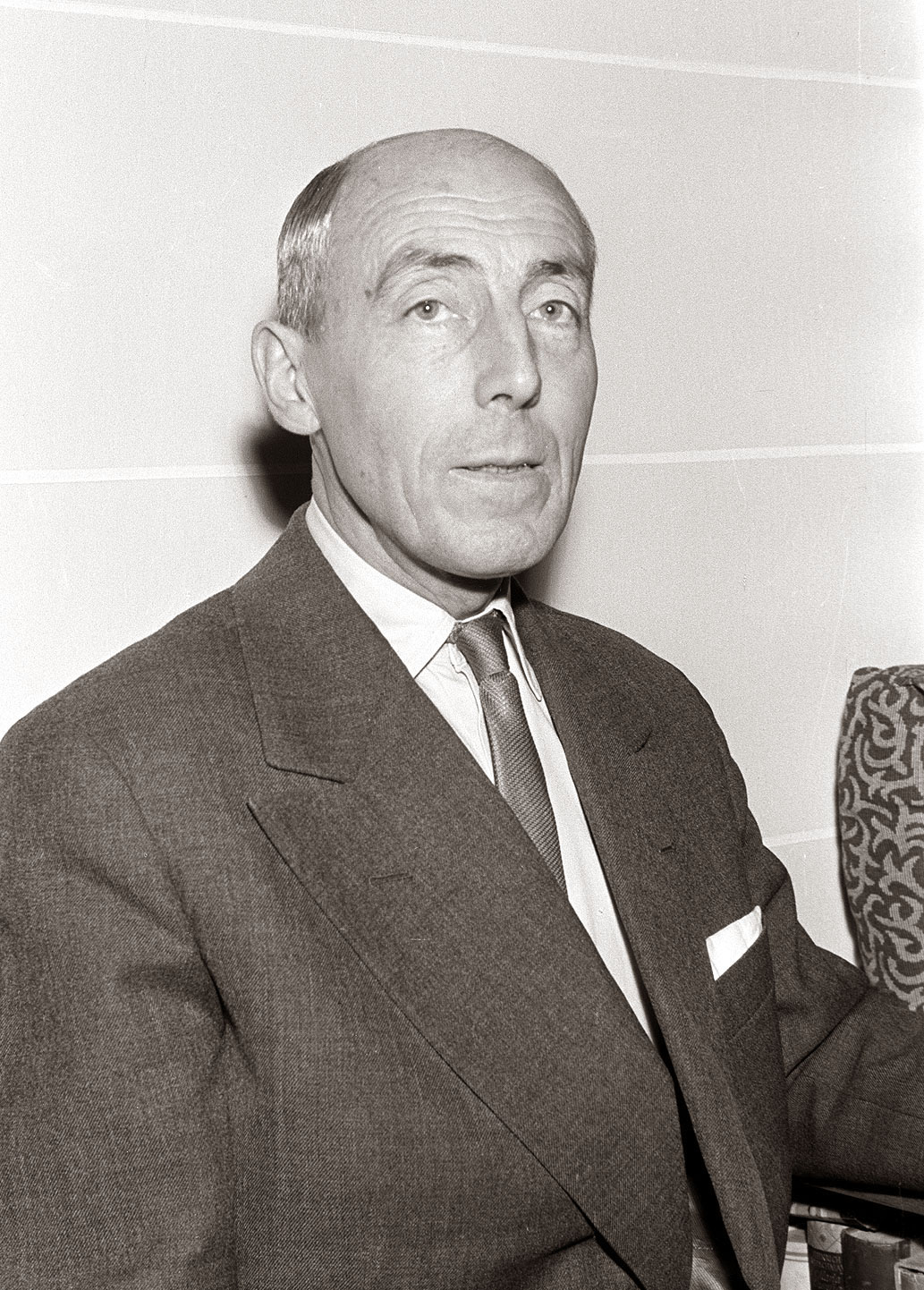
Leon Štukelj

Leon (Ancient Greek: λέων, romanized: léon; leōn) is a first name of Greek origin, meaning "lion". It gave rise to similar names in other languages, including the Latin Leo, French Lyon or Léon, Irish Leon, Spanish León, Armenian Levon / Լևոն or Georgian Levan / ლევან.

In Greek mythology, Leon was a giant killed by Heracles. One of the oldest attested historical figures to bear this name was Leon of Sparta, a 6th-century BCE king of Sparta. During the Christian era, the name Leon was merged with the Latin cognate Leo, with the result that the two forms are used interchangeably.

A similar Greek name, Leonidas, means "son of a lion". Leonidas I, king of Sparta, was a famous bearer of that name.

The Ancient Greek word λέων ultimately comes from Proto-Semitic *labiʾ-, which is not Indo-European.

== People ==
Leon (English, German, Dutch, Russian version), Léon (French version), León (Spanish version) may refer to:

- Leon (mathematician) (fl. 400 BC), Greek mathematician, precursor of Euclid
- Leon of Modena (1571–1648), Venetian scholar
- Leon of Pella, Macedonian historian
- Leon of Phlius (fl. c. 620 BC), tyrant of his city
- Leon of Salamis (died 406 or 403 BC), Athenian politician and naval commander
- Leon of Sparta, Spartan king
- León Aillaud (1880–1936), Mexican politician
- Leon Ashley (1936–2013), American country music singer and songwriter
- Leon Askin (1907–2005), Austrian actor
- Leon Bailey (born 1997), Jamaican footballer
- Léon Bakst (1866–1924), Russian painter and scene- and costume designer
- Leon Bates (labor leader) (1899–1972), American union leader
- Léon Benigni (1892–1948), French fashion illustrator
- Leon Belasco (1902–1988), Russian-American musician and actor
- Leon Benois (1856–1928), Russian architect
- Leon Berkowitz (1911–1987), American abstract painter
- Leon Berry (1914–1996), American organist
- Leon Best (born 1986), Irish football player
- Léon Bloy (1846–1917), French writer
- Léon Blum (1872–1950), French politician and prime minister
- Léon Boëllmann (1862–1897), French composer
- Leon Bourgeois (1851–1925), French politician and prime minister
- Léon Breitling (1860–1914), Swiss watchmaker and businessman, founder of Breitling SA
- Leon Brittan (1939–2015), British politician
- Leon Burns (1942–1984), American football player
- Leon Cadore (1891–1958), American baseball player
- Leon Camier (born 1986), British motorcycle racer
- Léon Chagnaud (1866–1930), French businessman and politician
- Leon Chua, Chinese-American scientist
- Leon Chwistek (1884–1944), Polish philosopher, logician, mathematician and artist
- Leon Cooper (1930–2024), American physicist and Nobel Prize laureate
- Leon Cooperman (born 1943) American billionaire investor, hedge fund manager
- Leon Czolgosz (1873–1901), American anarchist, assassin of William McKinley
- Leon Dănăilă (born 1933), Romanian neurosurgeon
- Léon Deffontaines (born 1996), French politician
- Léon Dierx (1838–1912), French poet
- Léon Dion (1922–1997), Canadian political scientist
- Leon Draisaitl (born 1995), German ice hockey player
- León Duarte (1928–1976), Uruguayan trade unionist and anarchist
- Leon Durham (born 1957), American baseball player
- Leon Edel (1907–1997), American writer and literary critic
- Leon Edney (born 1935), American admiral
- Leon Edwards (born 1991), UFC Fighter
- Léon Arthur Elchinger (1908–1998), French Catholic archbishop
- León Febres Cordero (1931–2008), Ecuadorian politician and president
- Leon Feldhendler (1910–1945), Polish Jewish resistance fighter
- León Felipe (1884–1968), Spanish poet
- Leon Fleisher (1928–2020), American pianist and conductor
- Léon Foucault (1819–1868), French physicist
- Leon Friedman (legal scholar) (born 1933), American legal scholar
- Leon Friedman (politician) (1886 – 1948), American politician
- Léon Gambetta (1838–1882), French politician and prime minister
- Leon Garfield (1921–1996), British author
- Léon Gaumont (1864–1946), French inventor and industrialist
- Léon Gérin (1863–1951), Canadian lawyer
- León Gieco (born 1951), Argentinian musician and interpreter
- Leon Goldensohn (1911–1961), American psychiatrist and author
- Leon M. Goldstein (died 1999), American university administrator
- Léon Goossens (1897–1988), British oboist
- Leon Goretzka (born 1995), German footballer
- Léon Guérin (1807–1885), French author, poet, and naval historian
- Leon Harrison (1866–1928), English-American rabbi
- Leon Haslam (born 1983), British motorcycle racer
- Leon Hatziioannou (born 1965), Canadian football player
- León Herrera Esteban (1922–2003), Spanish military officer and politician
- Leon Jackson (born 1988), Scottish singer
- Leon Quincy Jackson (1926/1927–1995), American architect and professor
- Leon Jacobs (born 1995), American football player
- Leon James (footballer) (born 2001), Thai footballer
- Leon Jaworski (1905–1982), American lawyer
- Leon Johnson (disambiguation), multiple people
- Leon M. Keer (1934–2021), American engineer
- Leon S. Kennedy (character), protagonist of horror video game series Resident Evil
- León Klimovsky (1906–1996), Argentine film director, screenwriter and film producer
- Leon Klinghoffer (1916–1985), Jewish-American man who was murdered
- Leon Joseph Koerner (1892–1972), Canadian businessman
- Leon Koudelak (born 1961), Czech guitarist
- Léon Krier (1946–2025), Luxembourgish architect, architectural theorist, urban planner, and author
- Leon Lai (born 1966), Hong Kong actor and singer
- Leon Lederman (1922–2018), American physicist and Nobel Prize winner
- Leon Leyson (1929–2013), Polish-American Holocaust survivor and author
- Léon Augustin Lhermitte (1844–1925), French painter and etcher
- Leon Lundy, Bahamian politician
- Léon Marchand (born 2002), French swimmer
- Leon Marchlewski (1869–1946), Polish chemist
- Leon McKenzie (born 1978), British football player
- Leon McQuay III (born 1994), American football player
- Leon P. Miller (1899–1980), American lawyer, politician, and judge
- Leon Milo (1956–2014), American musician
- Leon Monde (1895–1931), American basketball player
- Leon Moser (1942–1995), American murderer
- Léon Motchane (1900–1990), French industrialist and mathematician
- Leon O'Neal Jr. (born 1998), American football player
- Leon Orr (born 1992), American football player
- Leon Panetta (born 1938), American politician
- Leon Pescheret (1892–1971), British-American designer, watercolorist, etcher, and illustrator
- Léon Pétillon (1903–1996), Belgian politician
- Léon Abel Provancher (1820–1892), Canadian priest and naturalist
- Leon Punch (1928–1991), Australian politician
- Leon Radosevic (born 1990), Croatian basketball player
- Leon Redbone (1949–2019), American singer and songwriter
- Leon Robinson (born 1962), American actor and singer
- Leon Rotman (born 1934), Romanian canoer
- Leon Russell (1942–2016), American singer and songwriter
- Léon Say (1826–1896), French economist and politician
- Leon Schiller (1887–1954), Polish director and composer
- Leon Schlesinger (1884–1949), American film producer
- Noël Regney, born Léon Schlienger (1922–2002), French songwriter
- Leon Schuster (born 1951), South African filmmaker, actor and musician
- Leon Shamroy (1901–1974), American film cinematographer
- Leon Simon (Zionist) (1881–1965), British intellectual and civil servant
- Leon Sperling (1900–1941), Polish footballer
- Léon Spilliaert (1881–1946), Belgian painter
- Leon Spinks (1953–2021), American boxer
- Leon Štukelj (1898–1999), Slovene gymnast
- Leon Sullivan (1922–2001), American civil rights leader
- Leon Sylvers III (born 1953), American singer, songwriter, record producer and musician
- Leon Taylor (born 1977), British swimmer
- Léon Teisserenc de Bort (1855–1913), French meteorologist
- Léon Theremin (1896–1993), Russian inventor
- Léon Thévenin (1857–1926), French electrical engineer
- Leon Thijssen (born 1968), Dutch show jumper
- Leon Thomas (born 1993), American actor
- Leon Topalian, American businessman, CEO of Nucor
- Leon Trotsky (1879–1940), Russian revolutionary and politician
- Leon Ulbricht (born 2004), German snowboarder
- Leon Underwood (1890–1975), British sculptor, painter and writer
- Leon Uris (1924–2003), American novelist
- Leon Vance (1916–1944), American aviators
- Leon V of Armenia (1342–1393), King of Armenia
- Léon Vaudoyer (1803–1872), French architect
- Léon Walras (1834–1910), French economist
- Leon Ware (1940–2017), American singer, songwriter and producer
- Leon White (1955–2018), American wrestler, better known as Big Van Vader
- Leon Wilkeson (1952–2001), American bassist, member of the rock band Lynyrd Skynyrd
- Leon Norman Williams (1914–1999), British barrister and philatelic writer
- León Zuleta (1952–1993), Colombian LGBT activist and writer

== Fictional characters ==
- Leon B. Little, a character from the 1986 American action comedy film Tough Guys, played by Eli Wallach
- Leon Garcia de Asturias, in Trinity Blood
- Leon Elliott, a Black Cat character
- Leon Jefferson III, in Baby Driver
- Leon Karp, a Roseanne character
- Leon Kowalski, a Blade Runner character
- Leone "Léon" Montana, the titular protagonist of Léon: The Professional
- León Vargas, the male lead character in the Disney Channel telenovela series, Violetta
- Leon von Schroeder, a character from the series Yu-Gi-Oh!
- Leon (Squirrel Boy)
- Leon, a character on The Andy Griffith Show

=== Video games ===
- Leon S. Kennedy, a character from the Resident Evil franchise
- Squall Leonhart, aka Leon, a Final Fantasy character
- Leon Belmont, a Castlevania character
- Leon Powalski, a Star Fox character
- Leon (Dead or Alive) playable character in the Dead or Alive franchise.
- Leon (Pokémon), a character from the games Pokémon Sword and Shield
- Leon, a character from Battle Arena Toshinden
- Leon, a character in the mobile video games, Brawl Stars and Squad Busters
- Leon Kuwata, from the game Danganronpa: Trigger Happy Havoc
- Leon Magnus, a Tales of Destiny character

== See also ==
- Leo (given name)
- Levon (name)
