= Arzumanyan =

Arzumanyan, Arzoumanian or Arzumanian is an Armenian surname; in Armenian: Արզումանյան, Western Armenian Արզումանեան.

Notable people with the surname include:

== Arzumanyan ==
- Alexander Arzumanyan (born 1959), Armenian politician and diplomat
- Andre Arzumanyan, Armenian-Iranian film score composer and pianist
- Mikael Arzumanyan (born 1973), Armenian military personnel
- Mkrtich Arzumanyan (born 1976), Armenian actor, humorist, showman, screenwriter, producer
- Robert Arzumanyan (born 1985), Armenian footballer
- Vladimir Arzumanyan (born 1998), Armenian singer
- Yuri Arzumanyan (born 1952), Soviet and Russian spacecraft engineer

== Arzoumanian ==
- Ana Arzoumanian (born 1962), Argentine lawyer and writer
- Baghdasar Arzoumanian (1916–2001), Armenian architect
- Dr.Christine Gabriel Arzoumanian (born 1981), Lebanese Armenian PHD

== Arzumanian ==
- Georgy Arzumanian (born 1980), Armenian-Ukrainian chess player
