= Ruoff =

Ruoff is a surname. Notable people with the surname include:

- Alex Ruoff (born 1986), American basketball player
- A. Lavonne Brown Ruoff (born 1930), American writer and academic
- Bernie Ruoff (born 1951), Canadian football player
- David Ruoff, American historian and writer
- Richard Ruoff (1883–1967), German general
- Rodney S. Ruoff (born 1957), American physical chemist and nanoscience researcher
