= Laxon =

Laxon is a surname. Notable people with the surname include:

- Herbert Laxon (1881–1965), English rugby union player
- Sheila Laxon, Welsh horse trainer

== See also ==
- Lacson, surname
- LaVon (given name)
