= Lavon =

Lavon (Hebrew: לָבוֹן) may refer to:

== Places ==
- Lavon, Israel, a community in the Galilee, Israel
- Lavon, Texas, a suburb of Dallas in Collin County, Texas
- Lake Lavon, a lake in Texas

== People ==
- Pinhas Lavon (1904–1976), Israeli politician

== Other ==
- Lavon Affair, a failed Israeli false flag on American and British targets in Egypt

== See also ==
- Patrick Lavon Mahomes
  - Patrick Lavon Mahomes, II
- LaVon (given name)
- Levon (disambiguation)
