= Historical poetry =

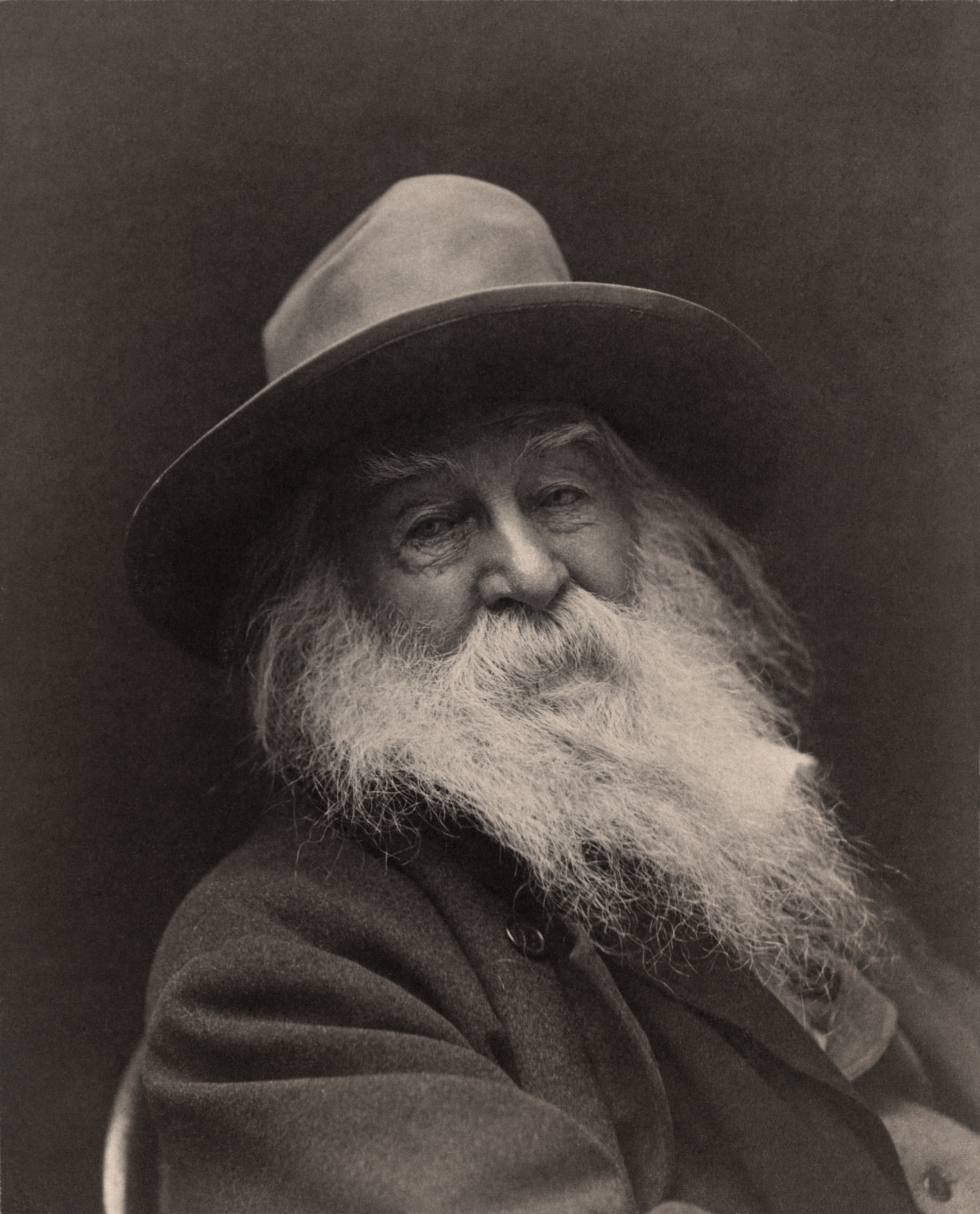
Walt Whitman, whose poetry was greatly influenced by the American Civil War

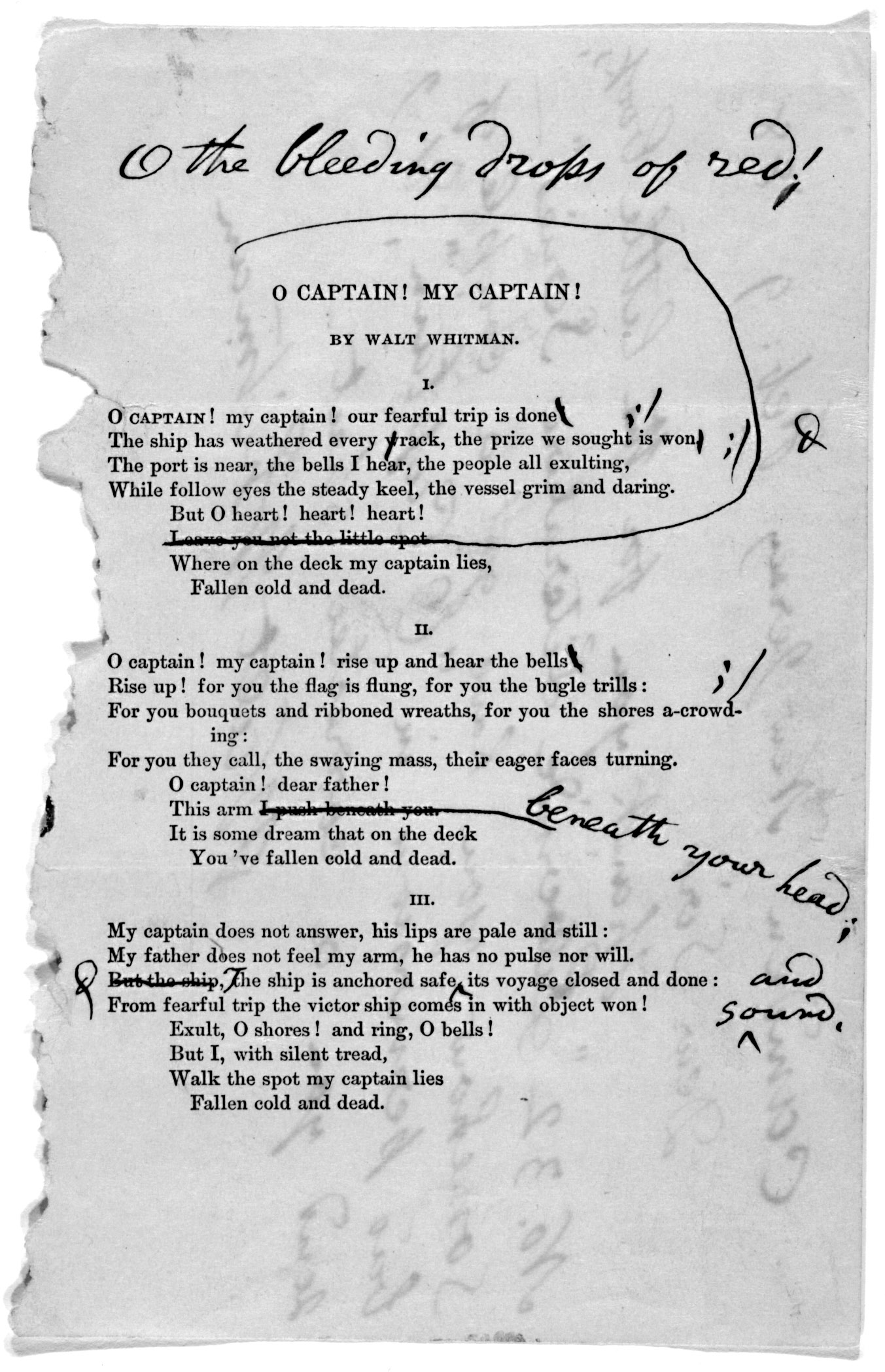
Whitman's O Captain! My Captain!

Historical poetry is a subgenre of poetry that has its roots in history. Its aim is to delineate events of the past by incorporating elements of artful composition and poetic diction. It seems that many of these events are limited to the phenomenon of war, merely because war in and of itself foments not only hostilities amongst men, but also severely transposes the character of a society in general. The poetry of Walt Whitman, for instance, reflects scenes of the American Civil War which occurred during his lifetime.

In addition, figurative devices such as alliteration, assonance, metaphor, and simile are invariably used to layer these historical poems with expanding, enriching meanings.

== Responsibility ==
In writing a historical poem, poets have a slightly different responsibility than do historians. A modern historian is expected to present factually correct narratives. A poet who writes historical poems can adhere to this ideal, but may also use artistic license to communicate ideas beyond mere fact, such as mythical or emotional truths.

Contemporary poets such as Lavonne J. Adams are also concerned with keeping the voices of historical persons alive. This is especially crucial when writing persona poems or other intimate portrayals of people who can no longer speak for themselves.

== Appeal ==
The interpretation of a historical poem is a matter of wide significance, particularly because it is linked to poetic intention. Cleanth Brooks writes in The Formalist Critics:

the author's intention as realized is the 'intention' that counts, not necessarily what he was conscious of trying to do, or what he now remembers he was then trying to do

To add to this, the purpose of a historical poem serves various ulterior motives. One of these motives might include informing the audience at the time of present events, often to draw parallels and make a political statement. Other motives might be very personal in nature, if the poets feel a connection to the historical event(s) they are recording. When history seems relevant to the poets' lives, historical poetry can become a tool of emotional expression just like any other type of poetry.

== Historical poems ==
These include the works of authors that embody particular events in history, notably gripping war scenes. A few examples of such poems include:

- John Brown's Body by Stephen Vincent Benét
- Civil War by Charles Dawson Shanly
- O Captain! My Captain! by Walt Whitman
- The Charge of the Light Brigade by Alfred, Lord Tennyson
- The Blue and the Gray by Francis Miles Finch
- A Message by Elizabeth Stuart Phelps Ward
- The Three Buxome Maids of Yoel by Samuel Pepys
- Boston by Ralph Waldo Emerson
- The Eve of Waterloo by Lord Byron
- Shiloh: A Requiem (April, 1862) by Herman Melville
- Vazetje Sigeta grada by Brne Karnarutić

No Ship Sets Out to Be a Shipwreck by Joan Wickersham (Eastover Press, 2024)
