= Levon =

Levon may refer to:

== Music ==
- "Levon" (song), a song by Elton John and Bernie Taupin
- Levon & the Hawks, an original alternative name for The Band
- Love for Levon, a concert held on October 3, 2012 in New Jersey as a tribute to the late drummer/singer Levon Helm of The Band
- Levon (band), a country music band

== Other uses ==
- Levon (name)

== See also ==
- Lavon (disambiguation)
