= Alan Marshall (New Zealand author) =

New Zealand author, scholar and artist

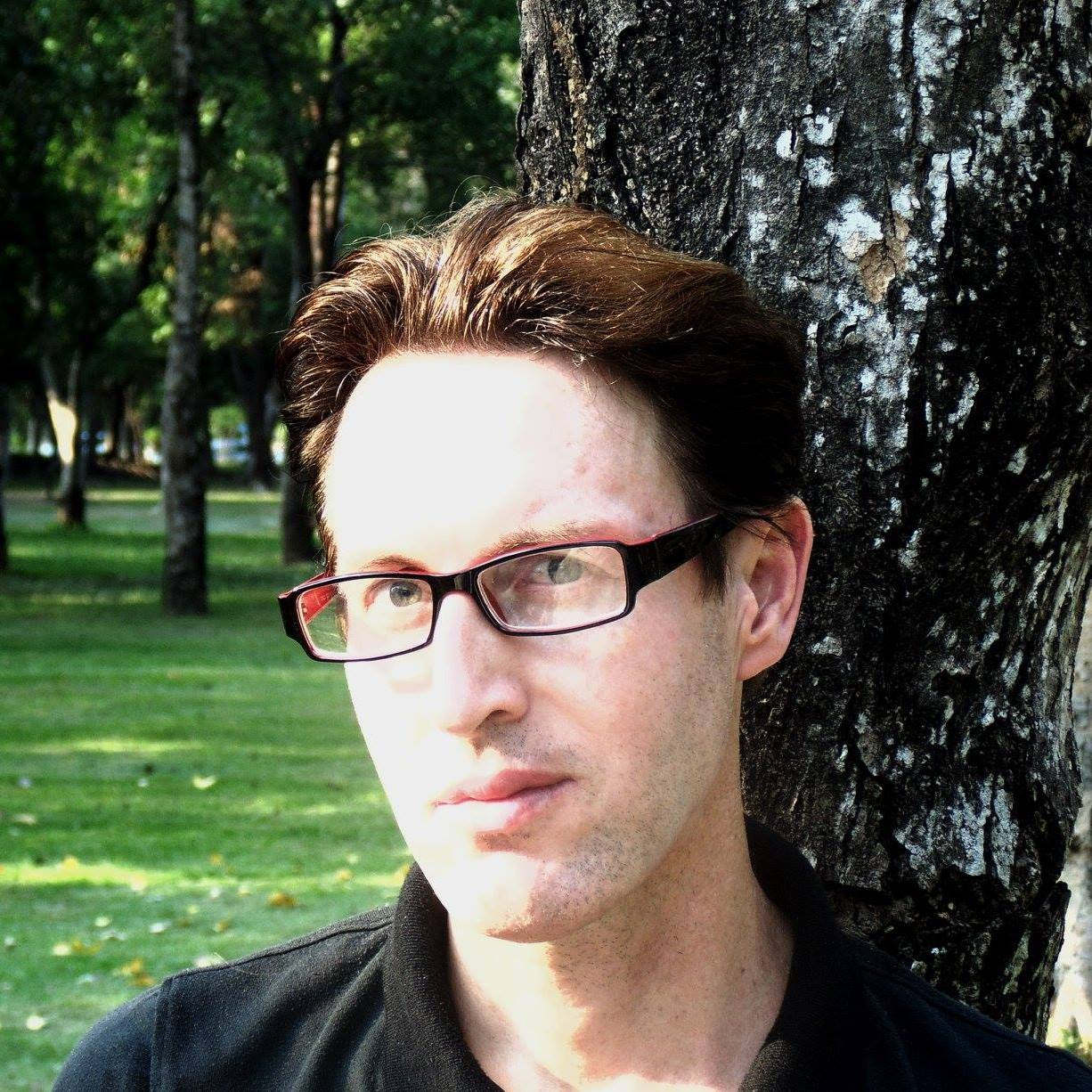
Alan Marshall in 2018 as shown in Swiss newspaper NZZ am Sonntag

Alan Marshall (born 1975) is an Australian author, scholar, and artist working within the discipline of environmental history. He has also been noted as a key scholar in environmental ethics and for his investigations into eco-friendly cities.

== Major projects ==
In 2006, Alan Marshall founded The Ecomimicry Project which melds ecology with innovation and sustainable art.

Examples of designs that emerged from this project include:

- a Hemp Sail Battle Cruiser for the Royal Australian Navy (in which a navy ship had its engines 'designed-out' and in their stead it is powered by sails made from eco-friendly hemp)
- a manure-powered swimming pool heating system (in which a luxury pool is heated by the composted body waste of the swimmers)
- a hairy-roofed Carpathian mountain village where the architecture is adorned with an engineered protective material that mimics the fur of local brown bears.

These designs, illustrated by and large by Marshall, were compiled into the Wild Design book and then praised by the Australian art & design media.

In January 2013, Marshall started a "Future Green Cities" project which (as noted by CNN and The Independent) explores graphic future scenarios of one-hundred super-ecofriendly cities across the world. Most of Marshall's original artworks from the project were part of a special exhibition at the Bauhaus Museum whilst the "Future London" cityscape from the project was displayed by the Museum of London as part of its 2018 London Visions exhibition and by the London Design Biennale as part of their 2021 exhibition at Somerset House. In 2015, the master-class part of this project conducted at Mahidol University was awarded the 2015 Kenneth M. Roemer Innovative Course Design Award by the Society for Utopian Studies.

The book of the project, Ecotopia 2121, written and illustrated by Marshall, has attracted broad critical acclaim. The Times Higher Education review of Ecotopia 2121 stated "very few academics ever produce anything as stunning and imaginative as this", whilst National Geographic UK, Al Jazeera, ZMEScience, Lithuanian Radio Television, Forbes, and Publishers Weekly variously declared it "curious and creative", "adventurous", "impressive", "visionary", and "monumental". Ecotopia 2121 was put on Resurgence and Ecologist magazine's Book of the Year list, won a Silver Medal at the 2017 Nautilus Book Awards and placed 1st in the Future Forecasts category of the 2016 Green Book Festival. In turn, the book's "Future San Diego" cityscape was highlighted on the LA7 TV show Piazza Pulita during the pre-COP26 climate talks, whilst the "Future Tokyo" cityscape adorned the frontispiece of the book Green Leviathan by Belgian philosopher Mark Coeckelbergh, and the "Macau 2121" cityscape featured in the pages of the popular Arab women's magazine Sayidaty.

In late 2015, Marshall began a new project in urban ecology called Frankencities which details the worst-case scenarios of emerging environmental problems in a series of cities around the world whilst comparing them to the insights offered by the Frankenstein story. The Daily Express and VICE reported that Marshall's work on Frankenstein extended to critiquing the popular idea that Mary Shelley was inspired to write the original Frankenstein novel because she was affected by a volcanically-induced climate change event known as the Year Without a Summer.

For the Frankencities project and for the Ecotopia 2121 project, Marshall developed a novel urban design methodology known as The Literary Method of Urban Design which is not so much about design but more about inventing new social change strategies. A film scripted by Marshall about this methodology was published by National Geographic Indonesia and became an "official selection" at a number of film festivals across Asia and Europe. As well, a series of Marshall's artworks produced via the Literary Method of Urban Design are being displayed in the Tartu Ülikooli Kunstimuuseum as part of Tartu's 2024 celebrations as the European Capital of Culture.

In 2020, Marshall began the Global Sheeplands project which investigates the ways that sheep have contributed to the making of the ancient and modern worlds. As part of this project, Marshall wrote a book called Sheeplands and also made on-screen contributions to a two-hour Arte / NDR TV documentary about the history of sheep farming and shepherding. Because Sheeplands follows the ten-thousand year long journey of shepherds from the neolithic Levant to Iron Age Wales, Marshall was invited as an opening speaker to the 2024 Hay Festival hosted in the Welsh town of Hay-on-Wye.

Prior to his 21st century work in the eco-design field, Marshall was mainly involved in eco-philosophy and techno-criticism. In the 1990s, Marshall developed a postmodern version of the Human–Nature relationship, one that throws into doubt the idea that Nature is a united orderly system. Marshall's approach is heavily influenced by the science of ecology but has been criticised as privileging one school of ecology, i.e., plant sociology, over others such as systems ecology and the ecology of Gaia—both of which he critiques as shallow forms of environmentalism. Indeed, his book The Unity of Nature is one of the fiercest critiques of Systems Theory in general, and Gaia Theory and Chaos Theory in particular.

Marshall is also referred to as a critic of the car industry, of the nuclear industry and of space exploration. His writings on the latter subject have been cited as insightful but are usually regarded by scientists and engineers as being too radically "environmental" especially his calls for the protection of the Martian landscape.

== Fiction ==
Alan Marshall is also an award-winning writer of fiction; a genre he was very active within from about 1998 to 2002. His works of fiction include an historical novel, Lancewood, about an iconic New Zealand plant, and a science fiction radiodrama called This Pointless Thing Called Life that was broadcast on NPR, KFAI, KUNM, and XM Satellite Radio in the USA. In 2001 This Pointless Thing Called Life received the "Silver Award" from the Mark Time Awards by a panel that included Grammy-award winner Phil Proctor who said it was "definitely on a par with Hitchhikers Guide to the Galaxy".

Along with Peter Jackson's The Lord of the Rings movie trilogy, This Pointless Thing Called Life was nominated for a Vogel Award in the category "Best Long Form dramatic science fiction and fantasy production made in New Zealand in the year 2002". Like his scholarly writings, Marshall's fiction explores the relationships between "humans and technology" and between "humans and nature".

The sequel to This Pointless Thing Called Life was another award-winning full-length radio feature broadcast in four parts on XM Satellite and by some NPR stations in 2003. This sequel was titled This Miserable Thing Called Life.

== Books ==
- Alan Marshall (2026) How Sheep Shaped the World, Calon: UK.
- Alan Marshall (2024) Sheeplands, University of Wales Press: Cardiff.
- Alan Marshall (2016) Ecotopia 2121: A Vision of Our Future Green Utopia -- in 100 Cities, Arcade/Skyhorse Publ: New York. ISBN 978-1-62872-600-8
- Alan Marshall (2009) Wild Design: Ecofriendly Innovations Inspired by Nature, North Atlantic Books: Berkeley. ISBN 978-1-55643-790-8
- Alan Marshall (2006) Dangerous Dawn: The New Nuclear Age, BNI: Melbourne.
- Alan Marshall (2002) The Unity of Nature, Imperial College Press/World Scientific: London & Singapore ISBN 1-86094-330-6
- Alan Marshall (1999) Lancewood, Indra Publishers: Melbourne. ISBN 0-9585805-1-0
