= Levrone =

Levrone is a surname. Notable people with the surname include:

- Kevin Levrone (born 1964), American bodybuilder
- Sydney McLaughlin-Levrone (née McLaughlin; born 1999), American hurdler and sprinter

== See also ==
- Levon (name), both a given name and a surname
