= The Siege of Sziget =

Hungarian epic poem, 1651

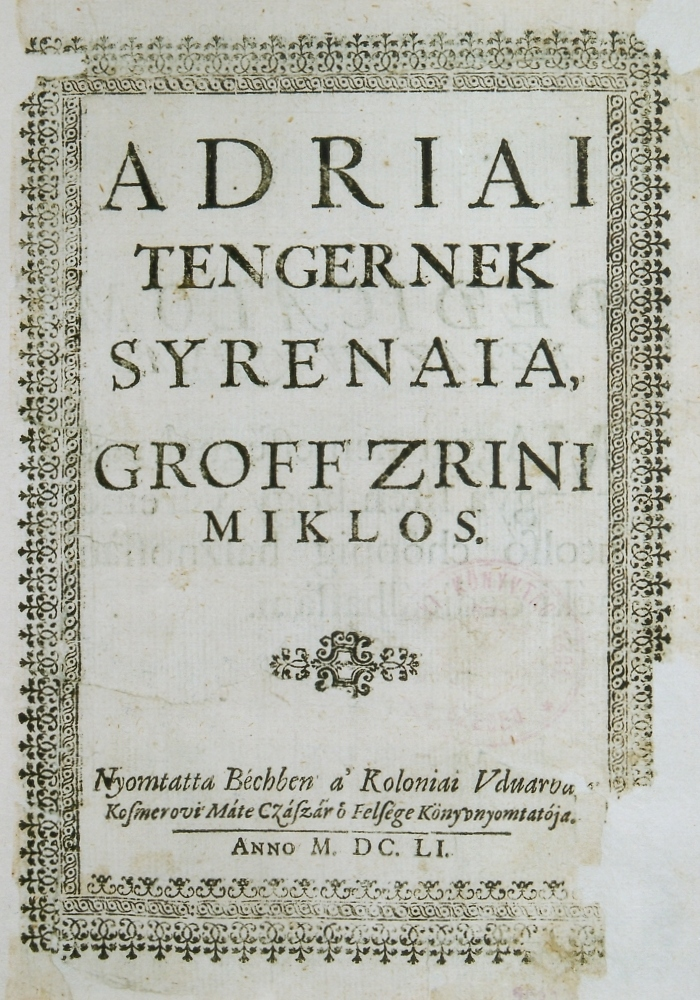
Title page of the first edition (1651)

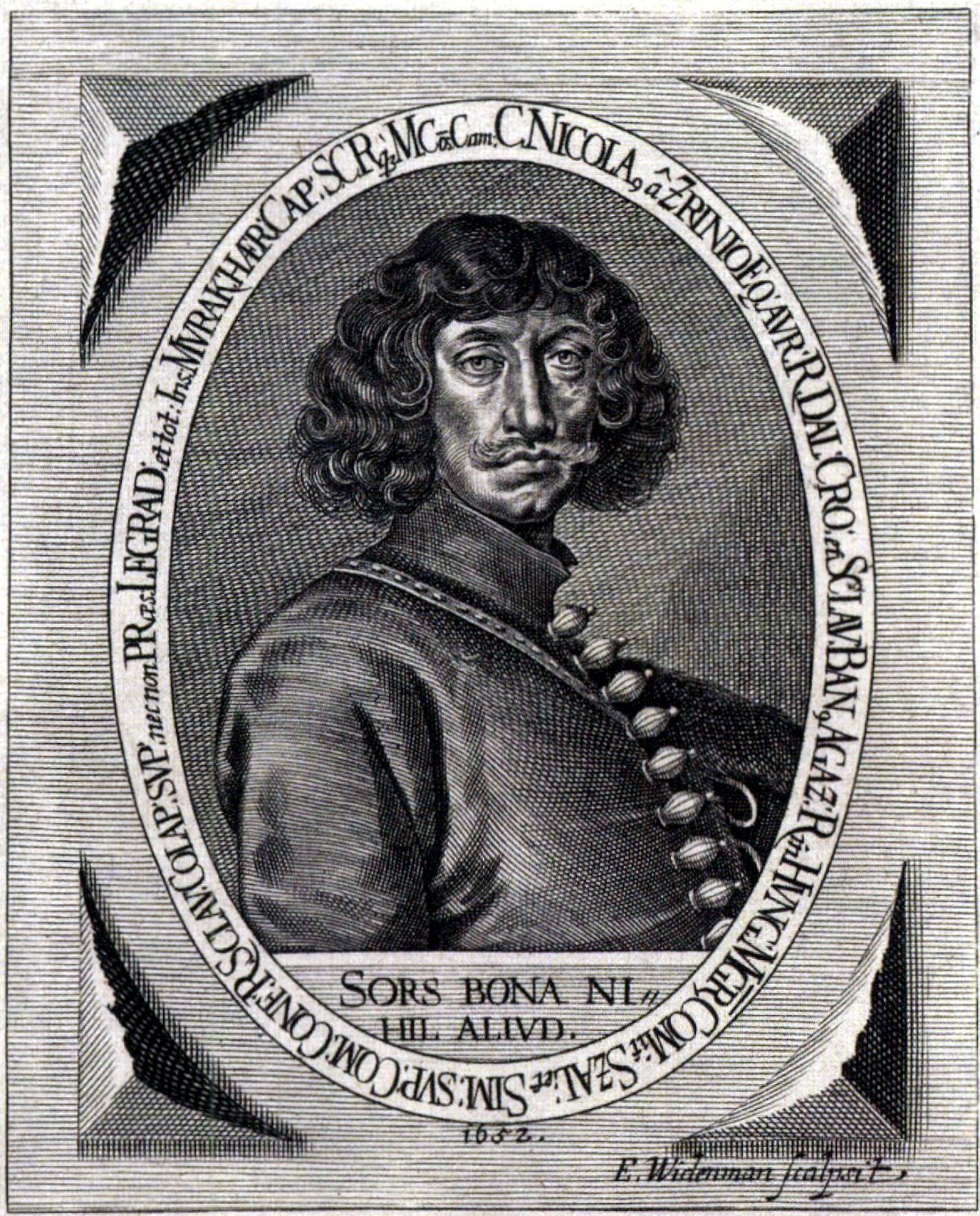
Miklós Zrínyi (Nikola VII Zrinski), the author. (1620–1664)

The Siege of Sziget or The Peril of Sziget (Hungarian: Szigeti veszedelem, Latin: Obsidio Szigetiana) is a Hungarian epic poem in fifteen parts, written by Miklós Zrínyi in 1647 and published in 1651, about the final battle of his great-grandfather Nikola IV Zrinski (Miklós Zrínyi in Hungarian) against the Ottomans in 1566. The epic was originally published within the book Siren of the Adriatic Sea (Hungarian: Adriai tengernek Syrenaia) where it was accompanied by several lyric poems.

== Narrative and style ==
The poem recounts in epic fashion the Battle of Szigetvár, in which a vastly outnumbered Croatian-Hungarian army tried to resist a Turkish invasion. The battle concluded when Captain Zrinski's forces, having been greatly depleted, left the fortress walls in a famous onslaught. Approximately four hundred troops forayed into the Turkish camp. The epic concludes with Zrinski killing Sultan Suleiman I, before being gunned down by janissaries. Being in the epic tradition, specifically modeled on the Iliad and Gerusalemme Liberata, it opens with an invocation, though not of the muse, but of the Virgin Mary, and often features supernatural elements; Cupid even appears in Part XII. Zrinski is compared to Hector several times in the text.

The verse is dodecasyllabic, typically but not exclusively with a caesura after the sixth syllable, resembling the alexandrine verse, organised into quatrains with AAAA rhyme scheme:

Én az ki azelőtt iffiu elmével
Játszottam szerelemnek édes versével,
Küszködtem Viola kegyetlenségével:
Mastan immár Mársnak hangassabb versével

== Title ==
The book is today best known under its long-standing Hungarian title, Szigeti veszedelem, literally "The Peril of Sziget." Zrinski's original Latin title, however, was Obsidionis Szigetianae, literally "The Siege of Sziget." This discrepancy is explained by the fact that 17th-century Hungarian had no distinct word for "siege" (the paucity of contemporary Hungarian vocabulary is, in fact, lamented by Zrinski in the epic's foreword) the modern-day "ostrom" ("siege") was taken from the German sturm at some later date, at which point "veszedelem" took on the exclusive meaning of "peril," thereby changing the apparent meaning of the title. The 2011 English translation was published as The Siege of Sziget, based on the original Latin rather than the later Hungarian title.

== Summary ==
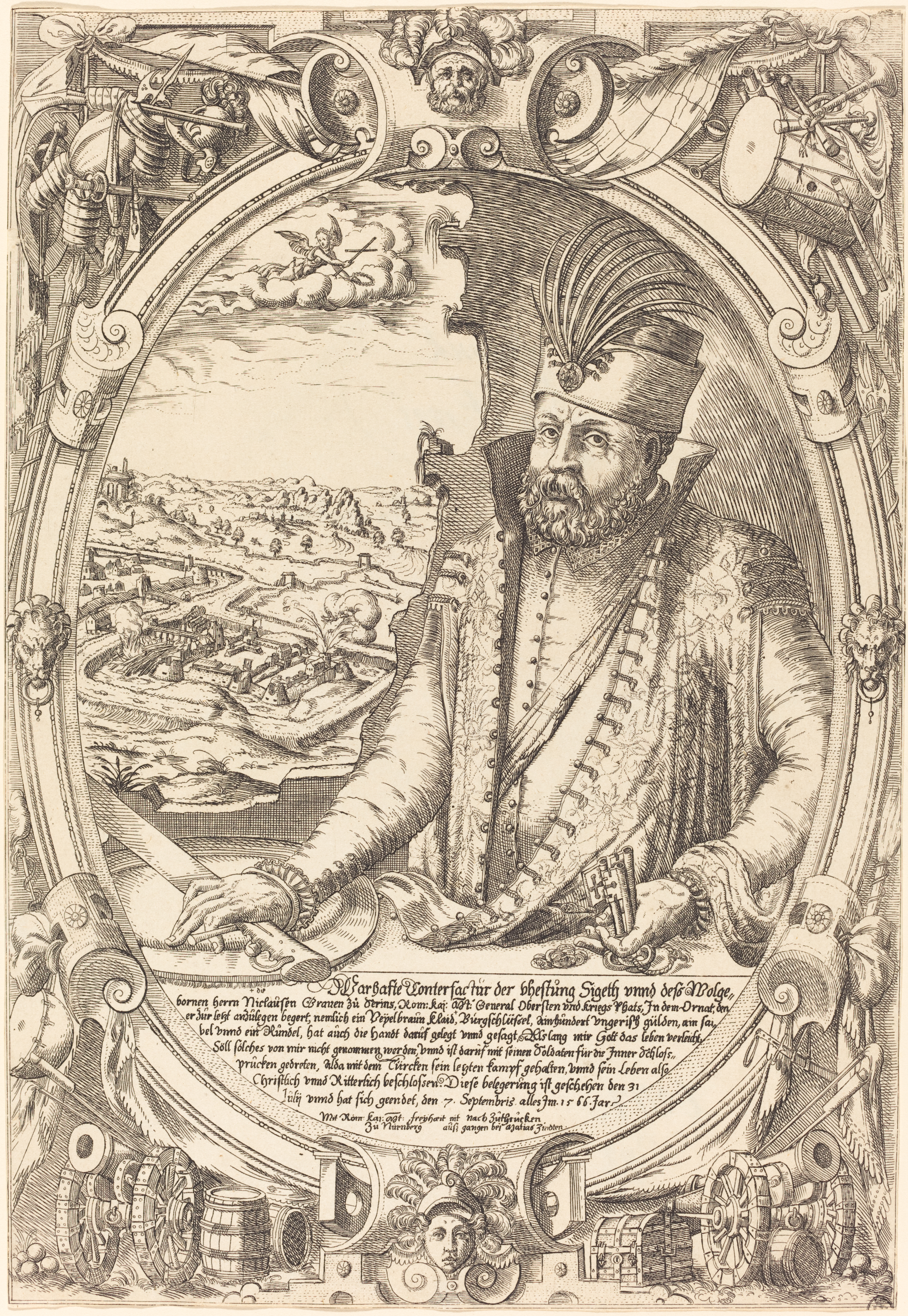
Nikola IV Zrinski, the protagonist of the epic. (1508–1566)

=== Prologue ===
The book begins with a short introduction in prose. The author first sets out to place his text in the tradition of Homer and Virgil. Though he declares that his work is not comparable to theirs, they were poets first and foremost, and he is a warrior who only has a little spare time to devote to literature. He also states that he has not once proofread the epic. He then goes on to make a short explanation of the work, stating first that he has mixed legend and history, and that the distinction should be obvious to the discerning reader. He recounts how he researched the death of Sultan Suleiman, and that it is his considered opinion, based on historical consensus, that the Sultan died at Zrinski's hand. Furthermore, he defends his use of romance as a theme, saying that he himself has been afflicted by love in the past, and that even Mars pined for Venus.

=== Parts I–II ===
The story begins in heaven, describing God's anger at the Hungarians for having abandoned their faith. He decides to send Archangel Michael into hell to awaken Alecto, a fury, to be sent into the heart of Sultan Suleiman. Alecto appears in a dream to the sultan, posing as his father, and goading him to make war on the Hungarians. Suleiman awakens and immediately begins to assemble his armies and best soldiers from far and wide, including the sorcerer Alderan, the immensely strong Demirham, and the famed Saracen Deliman. Deliman is in love with the sultan's daughter Cumilla, who is however betrothed to another. At the same time, Captain Nikola Zrinski implores God to take his life before he grows old and feeble. God hears his prayer and sees his piety, and promises him that he will not only fulfill his wish, but also give him the ultimate reward of martyrdom. In a major act of foreshadowing, God decrees that Zrinski will be rewarded for his devotion by dying in the upcoming battle, but not before taking the life of the sultan.

=== Parts III–V ===
As the Turkish invasion force marches towards their destination of Eger, Suleiman dispatches a basha to Bosnia. He is ambushed by on the way by Zrinski's men and utterly defeated by. The unexpected loss convinces the sultan to divert towards Szigetvár instead. This serves primarily as an illustration of God's will, as he moves Suleiman to change his original plans to fulfill God's greater plan. In Part IV, some commotion in the Turkish camp during the night leads to the misapprehension that Zrinski has attacked. Two hastily scrambled Turkish forces mistakenly do battle against each other, leading to major Turkish losses. Zrinski meanwhile assembles his forces, leading to another litany of heroes. The chief protagonist amongst these is Deli Vid, an apparent Turkish convert who fights alongside the Hungarians. Zrinski, expecting that he will die in the upcoming battle, sends off his young son, the poet's grandfather, to the safety of the emperor's court. Szigetvár now awaits the siege.

=== Parts VI–XIII ===
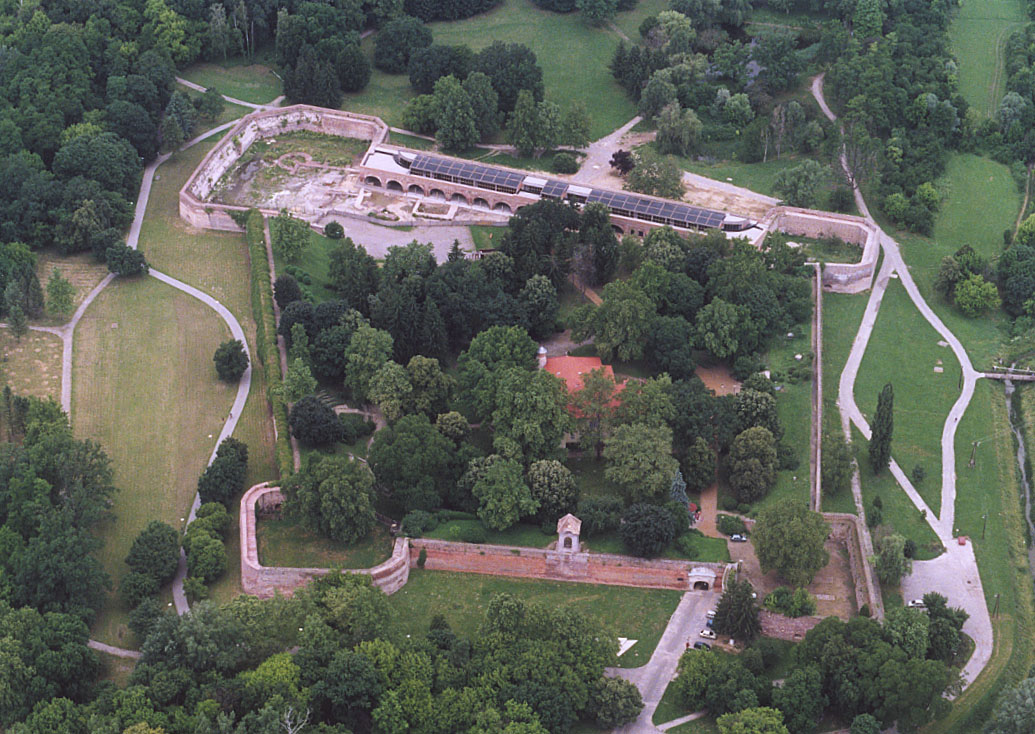
The Fortress of Szigetvár, as it appears today.

The battle of Szigetvár begins in earnest. A Turkish expeditionary force is brutally crushed by Zrinski and his men, most notably Deli Vid. On the next day of the battle, with the arrival of the Sultan's army, Demirham and Deli Vid do battle, but neither is able to gain the upper hand. They agree to meet the next day, which again leads to a stalemate.

In one sub-plot, two Croatian soldiers try to covertly break through the enemy lines by night to deliver a message to the emperor. They inflict grievous casualties on the Turkish forces, including killing the sultan's high priest, Kadilsker. They are eventually discovered and killed.

Part XII tells of the illicit romance between Deliman and Cumilla. This canto combines themes of romance, eroticism, and death. They have several liaisons, and both characters are presented in a negative light. In the end, Cumilla is accidentally poisoned and Deliman, goes mad with grief for several days, killing hundreds of Turks.

In contrast to this is Deli Vid and his bedouin wife Barbala. In Part XIII, after Vid has been captured by the Turks during a battle, his wife, who does not even speak Hungarian, dons his armor and rides into the camp to effect his (successful) rescue.

The Turks suffer grievous losses the entire time, and finally the sultan decides to decamp. In Part XIV, Zrinski, having nearly exhausted his own men, sends a final letter of farewell to his son and to the emperor. In another act of divine intervention, the carrier pigeon bearing the letter is intercepted by a hawk, and the letter falls into the camp. Realizing from the letter the defenders' desperate situation, the sultan decides to finish the battle. This is again an illustration of God's will, as He desires both that the Sultan should die and that Zrinski should have his promised martyrdom.

=== Parts XIV–XV ===
The seer Alderan is entrusted with planning the final assault. He takes several captive Hungarian youths into a forest clearing, where he slaughters them and paints arcane circles with their blood. Opening a portal to hell, he summons forth a demonic army to attack Szigetvár. Although the fiends are reluctant to come, Alderan prevails upon them after threatening to invoke the name of Christ. After a lengthy description of the infernal hordes, which figures from Greek mythology, the last to arrive is Ali, who informs Alderan that Muhammad's sword has been broken, and that both he and Muhammad are now are eternally tormented in hell. Ali then drags Alderan down to hell in exchange for the help he has received.

In heaven, God sees the progression of the battle, and sends Archangel Gabriel with an angelic host to fight the demonic onslaught. With the supernatural battle swirling around him, Zrinski instructs his men to take one final charge out of the fortress. Not needing to protect a path of retreat, the small battalion does massive damage to the Turkish forces. In the fracas, Zrinski spots Suleiman and beheads him. Demirham and Deli Vid meet one last time and each kills the other.

Not daring to approach the Hungarians, janissaries open fire, and Zrinski with his band of heroes is gunned down, completing the prophecy. Each soul is taken up by an angel to heaven, with Gabriel escorting Zrinski personally.

=== Epilogue ===
There is a five-line epilogue, which is the only section of the work which breaks the quatrain mold. It is a short prayer to God, recapping Zrinski's devotion and martyrdom, and asking for favor on behalf of the poet himself by virtue of the elder Zrinski's merits.

== Influences ==
In the prologue Zrinski acknowledged Homer and Vergil as his models in mixing of historical fact and legend, and already the first verses are heavily inspired by those of the Aeneid. Italian Baroque poets Torquato Tasso and Giambattista Marino were also a significant source of inspiration. Brne Karnarutić from Zadar was the first poet to treat the topic of the siege of Sziget in his Croatian poem Vazetje Sigeta grada ("The Conquest of the City of Sziget"), published in 1584, which is likely to have influenced Zrinski as well. However, the epic "remains profoundly original and Hungarian".

== Translations ==
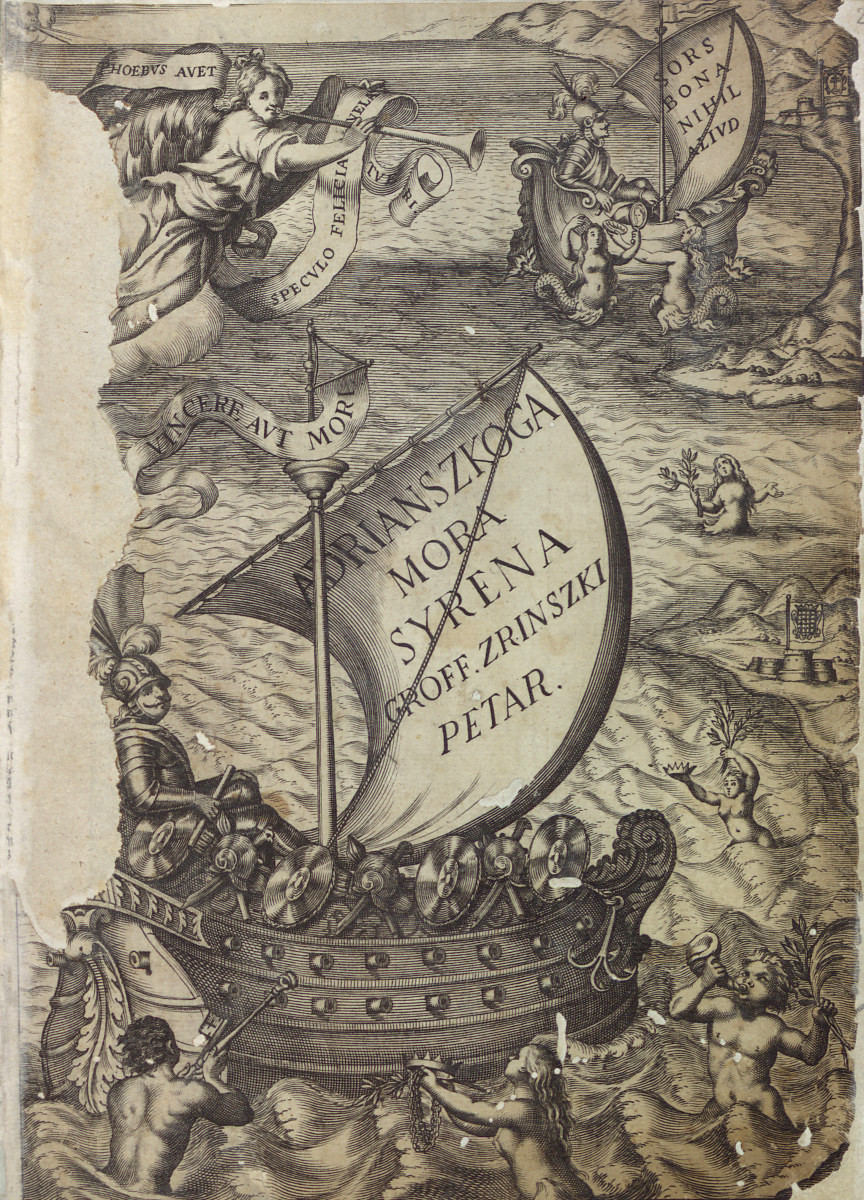
Frontispiece of the 1660 Croatian translation by Petar Zrinski.

=== Croatian (Petar Zrinski: Adrijanskoga mora sirena) ===
Immediately after the publication of Syrenaja, Miklós's brother Petar Zrinski commenced his own adaptation into Croatian, which wasn't an entirely direct translation of the epic, as Petar added 137 stanzas of his own, omitted 41, and substantially revised 21 stanzas of the original. The translation-adaptation was published in 1660 as Adrijanskoga mora sirena (the epic itself titled as Opsida sigetska), and republished in 1957 (edited by Tomo Matić) and 2016 (ed. Josip Bratulić). The language of the text is dialectally mixed, primarily Chakavian but with elements of Kaykavian and Shtokavian.

Compared to the original, in his translation Petar used a more complex rhyme scheme, with not only end-rhymes but also internal rhymes before the caesura, in line with traditional Croatian poetic practice:

Ovo ja ki prvo u mojoj mladosti
nastojah marlivo v ljubave kriposti,
suprotstah batrivo vsakoj okornosti,
sad ću spivat pravo Marča batrivosti.

=== Other languages ===
A German and an Italian translation were produced in the late 1800s and 1908 respectively. A new German translation was published in Budapest in 1944; the translator, Árpád Guilleaume, was an officer in the Hungarian military, and his work was suppressed by the subsequent Communist regime. An English translation was published in Washington DC in 2011 by László Kőrössy. In 2015, a French translation of the complete poem by Jean-Louis Vallin, rendering the Hungarian meter into French alexandrine, was published at the Presses Universitaires du Septentrion in a bilingual edition.

== Reception and legacy ==
According to Encyclopædia Britannica Online, it is "the first epic poem in Hungarian literature" and "one of the major works of Hungarian literature". Kenneth Clark's TV series Civilisation lists the Szigeti veszedelem as one of the major literary achievements of the 17th century.

Compared to the Hungarian text, the Croatian variant is regarded as a less remarkable work. While within Hungarian literature Veszedelem represented a significant qualitative step forward, Opsida did not stand out above the existing Croatian literary corpus. Croatian literary historians have described its language, constrained by the demanding rhyme scheme and influenced by foreign languages, as awkward and difficult to comprehend, and Petar as an overall little skilled poet.

== See also ==
- Nikola Šubić Zrinski (opera)
