= Arzuman =

Arzuman (Armenian: Արզուման) is an Armenian male first name. It is derived from the Persian word "Arzumand" (Persian: آرزومند), meaning "nostalgia", "well-wisher", "hoping". The name has received a special distribution among Armenians in Nagorno-Karabakh. The name of Arzuman is a formative word of the Armenian surname Arzumanyan.
