= Levon (name) =

Levon or Lévon is an Armenian given name (in Armenian Լեւոն) equivalent to Leon. It is also a surname. Notable people with the name include:

== Given name ==
=== Levon ===
- King Leo (disambiguation), a series of individuals known as King Levon (in Armenian)
- Levon Abrahamian (born 1947), Armenian anthropologist and historian
- Levon Aghababyan (1887–1915), Armenian mathematician and teacher
- Levon Aghasyan (born 1995), Armenian triple jumper
- Levon Altonian (1936–2020), Lebanese football player
- Levon Ambartsumian (born 1955), Armenian classical violinist and conductor
- Levon Ananyan (1946–2013), Armenian journalist and translator
- Levon Aronian (born 1982), Armenian chess Grandmaster
- Levon Babujian (born 1986), Armenian chess Grandmaster
- Levon Garabed Baljian (1908–1994), Armenian Supreme Patriarch
- Levon Bayramyan (born 1998), Russian footballer of Armenian descent
- Levon Alexander Boyadjian (1921–2002), Armenian Egyptian photographer
- Levon Chailakhyan (1928–2009), Russian physiologist, biophysicist, and embryologist of Armenian origin
- Levon Chaushian (born 1946), Armenian composer, vice-president of the Armenian Composers' Union and chairman of the Armenian Composers Assembly
- Levon Chilingirian (born 1948), UK-based Armenian violinist, founder of the Chilingirian Quartet
- Levon Chookaszian (born 1952), Armenian art historian and the UNESCO Chair of Armenian Art History
- Levon Chorbajian (born 1942), American sociologist
- Levon Davidian (1944–2009), Iranian-Armenian politician, member of Iranian parliament
- Levon Geghamyan (born 1977), Armenian Greco Roman wrestler
- Levon Ghulyan, Armenian politician
- Levon Ashotovich Grigorian (1947–1975), Soviet Armenian chess player
- Levon Harutyunyan (1927–2007), Armenian biologist and scholar
- Levon Harutyunyan (born 1967), Armenian actor
- Levon Hawke (born 2002), American actor
- Levon Hayrapetyan (born 1989), Armenian football player
- Levon Helm (1940–2012), American rock musician, singer and actor; member of The Band
- Levon Ichkhanian (born 1964), Lebanese Armenian Canadian guitarist of stringed instruments specialist
- Levon Ishtoyan (born 1947), Soviet Armenian footballer
- Levon "Bo" Jones, American former death row inmate for 15 years
- Levon Julfalakyan (born 1964), Soviet Armenian Greco-Roman wrestler
- Levon Kemalyan (1907–1976), Armenian-American model railroading entrepreneur
- Levon Kendall (born 1984), Canadian basketball player
- Levon Khechoyan (1955–2014), Armenian writer and novelist
- Levon Khachigian (born 1964), Armenian Australian medical scientist
- Levon Khachikyan (1918–1982), Soviet Armenian historian and philologist
- Levon Kirkland (born 1969), American football linebacker
- Levon Lachikyan (born 1955), Armenian art critic and graphic artist
- Levon Larents (1875–1915), or Levon Kirisciyan, Ottoman Armenian writer, translator, journalist, editor, novelist, poet, and teacher
- Levon Malkhasyan (born 1945), Armenian jazz musician
- Levon Manaseryan (1925–2019), Armenian artist and professor
- Levon Marashlian (born 1948), American historian, professor and scholar
- Lévon Minassian, French-Armenian duduk player
- Levon Mirzoyan (1897–1939), Soviet politician; Secretary of Communist Party of the Azeri SSR (1926–1929) and the First Secretary of the Communist Party of the Kazakh SSR (1936–1938)
- Levon Mkrtchyan (born 1953), Armenian film and documentary film director
- Levon Mnatsakanyan (born 1965), Armenian politician
- Levon Orbeli (1882–1958), or Leon Orbeli, Armenian physiologist
- Levon Pachajyan (born 1983), Armenian footballer
- Levon Pashabezyan (born 1986), Armenian taekwondo practitioner
- Levon Pashalian (1868–1943), Ottoman Armenian short story writer, journalist, editor, novelist, and politician
- Levon Pogosian, Canadian Armenian professor of astrophysics
- Lévon Sayan (born 1934), or Levon Sanosyan, French-Armenian impresario and producer, operatic tenor
- Levon Shant (1869–1951), Armenian playwright, novelist, poet, and founder of the Hamazkayin National Cultural Foundation
- Levon Stepanyan (born 1971), Armenian footballer and coach
- Levon Ter-Petrosyan (born 1945), Armenian politician; first President of Armenia from 1991 to 1998
- Levon Tourian (1879–1933), Armenian-American cleric
- Levon Tumanyan (1869–1942), Russian politician and parliamentarian
- Levon Zekiyan (born 1943), Armenian scholar
- Levon Zourabian (born 1964), Armenian politician

=== Leon/Léon ===
- Leon I of Abkhazia, 8th-century Armenian king
- Leon II of Abkhazia, 9th-century Armenian king
- Leon III of Abkhazia, 10th-century Georgian king
- Leon of Kakheti (1503–1574), Georgian king
- León Arslanián (born 1941), Argentine lawyer, jurist and public official
- Leon Chechemian (1848–1920), Armenian cleric
- Leon Czolgosz (1873–1901), American wireworker and anarchist
- Leon Danielian (1920–1997), American ballet dancer and choreographer
- Alejandra León Gastélum (born 1976), Mexican Armenian politician
- Alexander Leon Gumuchian (stage name bbno$, born 1995), Canadian rapper and singer-songwriter
- Léon Gurekian (1871–1950), Ottoman Armenian writer, architect and political activist
- Pablo León Hakimian (1953–2024), Armenian Argentinian bishop
- Leon Srabian Herald (1896–1976), Armenian-American poet
- Leon Kalustian (1908–1990), Romanian journalist, essayist and memoirist
- Leon Khachatourian (born 1936), Iranian Armenian boxer
- Leon Merian (1923–2007), American jazz trumpeter and teacher
- Richard Leon Paniguian (1949–2017), Armenian British oil executive
- Leon S. Peters (1905–1983), American businessman, engineer and philanthropist
- Leon Petrosyan (born 1940), Russian mathematician and professor
- Grant-Leon Ranos (born 2003), Armenian footballer
- Leon Redbone (1949–2019), Armenian-American jazz musician
- Leon Sabua (born 2000), Russian footballer
- Leon Surmelian (1902–1992), Armenian-American writer
- Leon Takhtajan (born 1950), Russian-Armenian mathematical physicist
- Leon Topalian, American businessman
- Léon Arthur Tutundjian (1905–1968), Armenian painter

== Middle name ==
- Robert Levon Been (born 1978), American indie rock bass guitarist, guitarist, and singer

== Surname ==
- August Alexander Levón (1820–1875), Finnish entrepreneur and businessman
- Elen Levon (born 1994), Ukrainian-born Australian singer, songwriter, and dancer

== See also ==
- Levon (band), American band
- Levon (song), 1971 song by Elton John
- LaVon (given name)
- Leon (given name)
- Levin (given name)
