= Vazetje Sigeta grada =

Croatian historical epic

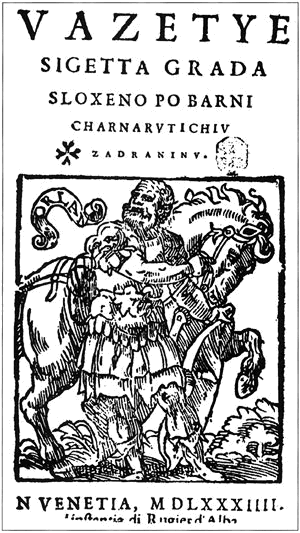
1584 published edition

Vazetje Sigeta grada (English: The Taking of the City of Siget) is a 16th-century epic poem written between 1568 and 1572 by Brne Karnarutić from Zadar, and deals with the 1566 Siege of Szigetvár defended by Nikola IV Zrinski, based on the writing Podsjedanje i osvojenje Sigeta of Zrinski's scribe and chamberlain, Franjo Črnko.

It was published posthumously, with the oldest surviving copy dated to 1584, but the first printing was most probably years before because was already well known and mentioned by scribe and poet Hortenzije Bartučević (d. 1579) from Hvar.

It is the first Croatian historical epic. It was also written in dedication to Juraj IV Zrinski, a Nikola IV's son.

== Contents ==
=== Composition and themes ===
The overall impression is based on opposition of Christian and "un-Christian", which is associated with just and unjust. The epic is described as twenty pages long, divided in four sections, and is written in doubly-rhymed dodecasyllable.

=== Summary ===
The first section of the epic is devoted to introducing Nikola Zrinski, Sultan Suleiman and the besieging Ottoman army. The second section describes the preparation of the Ottomans for an attack, with the third dealing with the final battle. The last section mentions the death of Suleiman, with the final charge led by Mehmed Paša Sokolović. This leads to the death and burial of Nikola Zrinski.

=== Publication history ===
- 1st edition, 1584, Venice
- 2nd edition, 1639, Venice
- 3nd edition, 1661, Venice (by Fordoci)
- 4th edition, 1866, Zagreb (by Ljudevit Gaj)

== See also ==
- The Siege of Sziget
