= Ana Arzoumanian =

Argentine lawyer, writer, poet, and translator

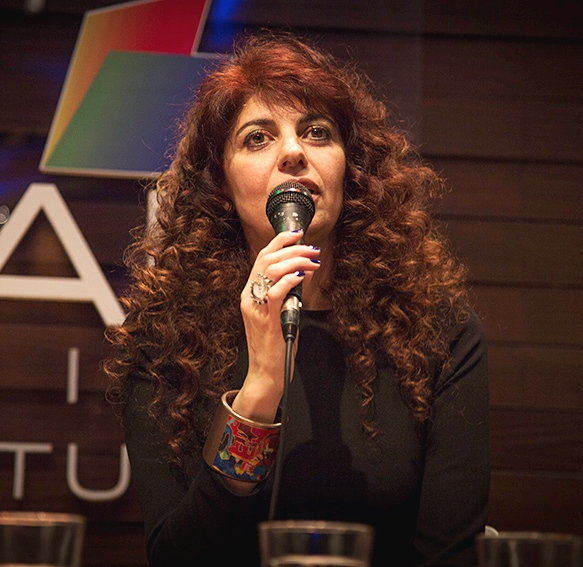
- Born: 21 April 1962 (age 64); Buenos Aires, Argentina
- Education: Universidad del Salvador
- Occupations: Lawyer, writer, translator
- Awards: Lucian Freud Accésit Award (2009)
- Website: anaarzoumanian.com.ar

Ana Arzoumanian (born 21 April 1962) is an Argentine lawyer, writer, poet, and translator.

== Biography ==
Ana Arzoumanian was born in Buenos Aires in 1962, a descendant of Armenian immigrants and the granddaughter of survivors of the Armenian genocide. She currently resides in Buenos Aires.

== Education ==
Arzoumanian earned a law degree from the Universidad del Salvador's Faculty of Legal Sciences. She completed a postgraduate degree in psychoanalysis at the Lacanian Orientation School of Buenos Aires.

== Academic career ==
Arzoumanian was a professor of philosophy of law at the Universidad del Salvador's Faculty of Legal Sciences from 1998 to 2001. From 2015 to 2016 she worked as a professor in the International Postgraduate Course in Creative Writing of the Latin American Social Sciences Institute (FLACSO) and as a visiting teacher to the Decolonia team of the Faculty of Law's social department at the University of Buenos Aires.

She attended the admittance of patients at the Borda Neuropsychiatric Hospital and the Hospital Argerich in Buenos Aires.

In 1992, she was an active member of the first arbitration course in Argentina, given by the National Training and Communication Directorate of the Ministry of Justice and Human Rights.

She is a member of the International Association of Genocide Scholars.

== Literary career ==
Arzoumanian has published several poetry collections with themes such as Armenian heritage, genocide, historical figures, and men's power over women. Her book Juana I, about Joanna of Castile, was adapted into the play La que necesita una boca in 2007.

She has translated works by Bonaventure des Périers, Susan Gubar, and Levon Khechoyan into Spanish.

== Awards and recognitions ==
- 2008: Yad Vashem International Scholarship for study of the Holocaust
- 2009: Lucian Freud Accésit Award from Proyecto al Sur

== Works ==
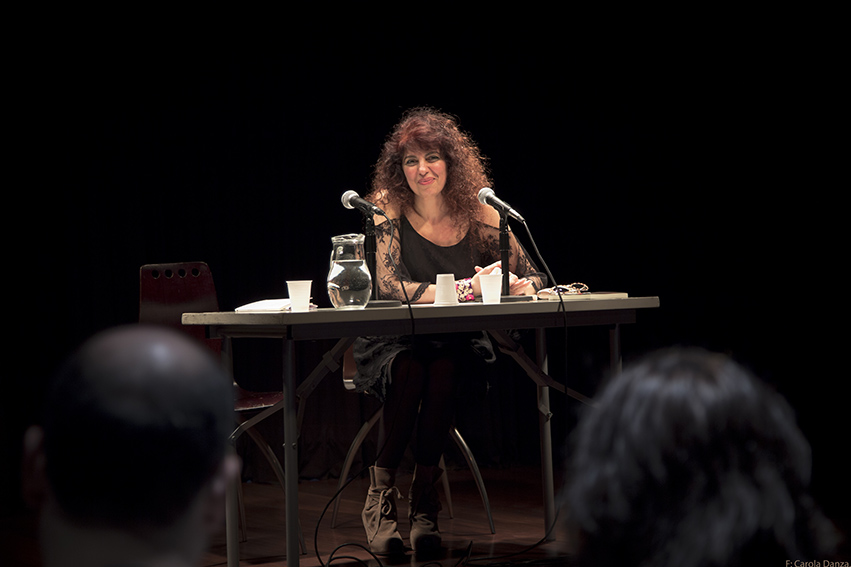
Ana Arzoumanian at the Centro Cultural de Cooperación in 2015

=== Books ===
- Labios (1st ed.). Grupo Editor Latinoamericano. 1993. ISBN 978-950-694-299-1.
- La universidad posmoderna (1st ed.). Grupo Editor Latinoamericano. 1994. ISBN 978-950-694-368-4.
- Debajo de la piedra (1st ed.). Grupo Editor Latinoamericano. 1998. ISBN 978-950-694-531-2.
- La mujer de ellos (1st ed.). Grupo Editor Latinoamericano. 2001. ISBN 978-950-694-641-8.
- El ahogadero (1st ed.). Tsé-Tsé. 2002. ISBN 978-987-1057-19-1.
- La granada (1st ed.). Tsé-Tsé. 2003. ISBN 978-987-1057-33-7.
- Juana I (1st ed.). Alción Editora. 2006. ISBN 978-950-9402-74-4.
- Mía (1st ed.). Alción Editora. 2007. ISBN 978-987-1359-32-5.
- Cuando todo acabe todo acabará (1st ed.). Paradiso. 2008. ISBN 978-987-9409-83-1.
- El depósito humano: una geografía de la desaparición (1st ed.). Edición de la Autora. ISBN 978-987-05-9121-4.
- Káukasos (1st ed.). Activo Puente. 2011. ISBN 978-987-24808-6-8.
- Mar Negro (1st ed.). Ceibo ediciones. 2012.
- Un idioma también es un incendio: 20 poetas de Armenia (1st ed.). Alción Editora. 2013. ISBN 978-987-646-346-1. (poetic version and prologue)
- Hacer violencia. El régimen insurrecto en el arte (1st ed.). Nahuel Cerrutti Carol Editor. 2014. ISBN 978-987-3649-02-8.
- Del vodka hecho con moras (1st ed.). Libros del Zorzal. 2015. ISBN 978-987-599-422-5.
- Infieles (1st ed.). Libros del Zorzal. 2017. ISBN 978-987-599-514-7.

=== Anthologies ===
- Velarde (2011), Secretary of Culture of San Luis Potosí

=== Translations ===
- El alambre no se percibía entre la hierba. Relatos de la guerra de Karabagh (2015), Levón Khechoyan, Hovhannés Yeranyan, Hecho Atómico. ISBN 9789872939236. Co-produced with Alice Ter Ghevondian.
- Cymbalum Mundi. Bonaventure des Périers (2014), Alción.
- Im anune hima e (2013), Editorial Antares. ISBN 9789939515229. Translation of the poem Káukasos into Armenian by Alice Ter Ghevondian.
- Un idioma también es un incendio. 20 poetas de Armenia (2013), Alción-Activo Puente. ISBN 9789876463461. Co-produced with Alice Ter Ghevondian.
- Lo largo y lo corto del verso Holocausto (2007), Susan Gubar, Alción.
- Sade y la escritura de la orgía, Poder y parodia en Historia de Juliette (2006), Lucienne Frappier-Mazur, Ediciones Artes del Sur. ISBN 9789879813898

=== Film appearances ===
- A – díalogos sin fronteras (2012), directed by Ignacio Dimattia

=== Theatrical adaptations of Arzoumanian's work ===
- La que necesita una boca, (2007). Directed by Román Caracciolo. Adapted from Juana I.
- Tengo un apuro de un siglo (2016). Directed by Román Caracciolo. Adapted from Del vodka hecho con moras, as well as El alambre no se percibía entre la hierba by Hovhannés Yeranyan.
