= Postmodern social construction of nature =

The postmodern social construction of nature is a theorem or speculation of postmodernist continental philosophy that poses an alternative critique of previous mainstream, Promethean discourse about environmental sustainability and ecopolitics.

== Position ==
Whereas traditional criticisms of environmentalism come from the more conservative "right" of politics, leftist critiques of nature pioneered by postmodernist constructionism highlight the need to recognise "the other". The implicit assumption made by theorists like Wapner refer to it as a new "response to ecocriticism [which] would require critics to acknowledge the ways in which they themselves silence nature and then to respect the sheer otherness of the non-human world."

== Criticism ==
Critics argue that, by capturing the nonhuman world within its own conceptual domain, postmodern exerts precisely the urge toward mastery that it criticizes in modernity. Thus, postmodern cultural criticism deepens the modernist urge toward mastery by eliminating the ontological weight of the nonhuman world. "What else could it mean to assert that there is no such thing as nature?". The issue becomes an existentialist query about whether nature can exist in a humanist critique, and whether we can discern the "others'" views in relation to our actions on their behalf. This is referred to as the Wapner Paradox.

== See also ==
David Demeritt's typology of the social construction of nature looks at the idea from several standpoints. He seeks to clarify the meaning through exploring the extent of the different uses applied to the term.

Other examinations of the social construction of Nature, from a postmodern perspective, include:

- Marshall, A, (2002) "The Unity of Nature: Wholeness and Disintegration in Ecology and Science", Imperial College Press / World Scientific: London / Singapore.
- Soule. ME, et al., eds, (1995) Reinventing Nature: Responses To Postmodern Deconstruction, Island Press.
- White, DR. (1997) Postmodern Ecologies, SUNY Press.
