= Levon Pashabezyan =

Armenian taekwondo practitioner

Medal record

Men's taekwondo

Representing Armenia

Youth European Championships
| Silver medal – second place | 2001 Pamplona | Featherweight |
| Gold medal – first place | 2003 Heraklion | Featherweight |

Levon Pashabezyan (born November 10, 1986) is an Armenian taekwondo athlete.

Pashabezyan won a gold medal at the 2003 Youth European Taekwondo Championships.

== See also ==
- Armenian Taekwondo Federation
- List of Taekwondo practitioners
