= Leo of Phlius =

6th-century-BCE ancient Greek tyrant

Leo was a tyrant of the ancient Greek city of Phlius. He is best known for his participation in a story in which the word philosopher was first coined, in 518 BC.

== Story ==
According to Cicero (Tusculanae Disputationes V-III), Pythagoras was in the court of Leo when he (Leo) asked Pythagoras what was his favorite art. Pythagoras said he had none, but that he was a philosopher:

"From whence all who occupied themselves in the contemplation of nature were both considered and called wise men; and that name of theirs continued to the age of Pythagoras, who is reported to have gone to Phlius, as we find it stated by Heraclides Ponticus, a very learned man, and a pupil of Plato, and to have discoursed very learnedly and copiously on certain subjects with Leon, prince of the Phliasii; and when Leon, admiring his ingenuity and eloquence, asked him what art he particularly professed, his answer was, that he was acquainted with no art, but that he was a philosopher. Leon, surprised at the novelty of the name, inquired what he meant by the name of philosopher, and in what philosophers differed from other men; on which Pythagoras replied, "That the life of man seemed to him to resemble those games which were celebrated with the 166 greatest possible variety of sports and the general concourse of all Greece. For as in those games there were some persons whose object was glory and the honor of a crown, to be attained by the performance of bodily exercises, so others were led thither by the gain of buying and selling, and mere views of profit; but there was likewise one class of persons, and they were by far the best, whose aim was neither applause nor profit, but who came merely as spectators through curiosity, to observe what was done, and to see in what manner things were carried on there. And thus, said he, we come from another life and nature unto this one, just as men come out of some other city, to some much-frequented mart; some being slaves to glory, others to money; and there are some few who, taking no account of anything else, earnestly look into the nature of things; and these men call themselves studious of wisdom, that is, philosophers: and as there it is the most reputable occupation of all to be a looker-on without making any acquisition, so in life, the contemplating things, and acquainting one’s self with them, greatly exceeds every other pursuit of life."
