= Leon Johnson =

Leon Johnson may refer to:

- Léon Johnson (1876–1943), French sport shooter
- Leon W. Johnson (1904–1997), U.S. Air Force general and Medal of Honor recipient
- Chaino (Leon Johnson, 1927–1999), American bongo player in the exotica genre
- Leon Johnson (running back) (born 1974), American football running back
- Leon Johnson (wide receiver) (born 2001), American football wide receiver
- Leon Johnson (end) (1904–1978), American football end
- Leon Johnson (footballer) (born 1981), English football defender
- Leon Johnson (cricketer) (born 1987), West Indian cricketer from Guyana
- Leon H. Johnson (1908–1969), American chemist and mathematician
- Leon Johnson (judge), judge in Arkansas

== See also ==
- Leonard Johnson (disambiguation)
