= LaVonne Salleé =

American artist

LaVonne Salleé (born January 18, 1946) is an American artist who is best known for her work with altered Barbie dolls. Like many conceptual artists, she uses materials not usually perceived as artistic in nature. She uses found object methods and a variety of craft skills to accrue her pieces of recycled art.

== Background and early life ==
Salleé was born in Roswell, New Mexico on January 18, 1946. Her father was a cartoonist who worked for Walt Disney; her mother was a seamstress who also worked as waitstaff. They were divorced when Salleé was four. Salleé's mother would subsequently remarry; this short marriage would result in two more daughters, who were separated from the family after the divorce. Salleé recalls that in her childhood her creativity was discouraged, as it was not expected to lead to financial stability.

Salleé grew up with no particular attachment to Barbie; she did not even own one while growing up. She was also a bit of a tomboy. Salleé did not settle anywhere for a long period; by age 25, she had lived in 35 different places in four states and attended nine schools.

As an adult, Salleé became a successful bank teller. However, she began to develop medical problems; from about 1993 onwards, she was plagued by fibromyalgia as well as some ill effects of menopause. By the time of her early retirement, she had over 25 years expertise in the field of bank fraud investigation. Her retirement at age 55 was caused by the debilitating effects of the fibromyalgia. Although unable to be employed, she wished to remain active.

== Career as an artist ==
Salleé's first artistic creations were in fabric arts, where she used a technique, she dubbed "Fabricollage" to fabricate portraits and pictures from scraps of cloth glued together. Besides works of fabric art, she also created beadwork, as well as doll clothing and accessories. Salleé segued into altering Barbies after constructing a series of unique mermaids.

=== Work with Barbies ===
Salleé then turned to altering Barbies as her medium in 2007, when she first saw them at the fifth annual Altered Barbie Show. In the altered Barbie movement, Barbie is "...a kind of three-dimensional blank canvas that allows artists to display their reverence, humor or biting satire." Salleé was at first hesitant to venture into altering Barbies, as Mattel has a history of legal action against parodists. In Salleé's specific case, she stated her motivation as, "I can do just about anything I think of with a Barbie. With any other medium, it just gets boring." Her re-creations of Barbie usually feature satiric commentary on social mores and political trends; the "wickedly funny" pieces often flaunt a dark humor that not everyone appreciates.

As part of her creative process, Salleé re-sculpts Barbies, which takes expertise developed through systematic trial and error because Mattel manufactured Barbies in varying formulations of plastic. Salleé also uses her skills as carpenter, fashion designer, and craftsperson to alter the Barbies in her dioramas. The constituents of her dioramas and sculptures come from garage sales, flea markets, and thrift stores.

While Salleé's creations sometimes feature passive Barbies being "Barbie-Q-ed", turned into chess pieces, or the like, they also fight monsters, engage in kinky rituals, or are transmogrified into hybrid beings such as centaurs, insects, or trees. Some of her creations involve religion. They include Barbie's Last Sleepover, a restaging of da Vinci's The Last Supper, as well as showing Barbie as a pregnant Virgin Mary, or as Mary comforting a dying Christ figure. However, even more than religious references, Barbie's nudity seems to provoke strong responses from viewers. Salleé's penchant for adding nipples to bare-chested Barbies riles some people. As Salleé remarks, "Nipples are my specialty...I can give her a beautiful set of nipples. She likes that." Salleé has also denoted her critics' attitude as, "Heaven forbid that Barbie should have nipples." Salleé is adamant that she does not create pornographic Barbies; indeed, she insists she is not into defaming Barbie. As a result of the controversy, Salleé's lease on her studio contains a provision forbidding display of her religious-themed or nude creations in a manner that would be visible from outside the shop.

In 2007, at the National Barbie Doll Convention, Salleé entered nine of her works in the altered Barbie juried show. One was rejected as "too distasteful"; the other eight all won prizes, including three first place ribbons. She then moved from San Francisco to Vallejo, California to open her One of a Kind Barbies gallery to display her work.

Lavonne Salleé has altered over 250 Barbies to date; they have been acquired by collectors both nationally and worldwide, from patrons as far-flung as Australia, Canada, and New Zealand. Her activities have widened to include offering workshops in Barbie alteration to other aspiring artists.

=== Beading art ===
After financial struggles, Salleé moved to Silverton, Oregon in 2013. However, she found that her altered Barbies were not selling well. She shifted to creating art with beads and mannequins and other found objects. In 2018 her work was exhibited in Oregon.

== Notable awards and exhibitions ==
- Three first place ribbons, two seconds, two thirds, and an honorable mention at the National Barbie Doll Convention, Dallas, Texas, July 2007
- Two first place ribbons, two seconds, and two thirds at the International Fashion Doll Convention 2008, Las Vegas, Nevada, July 2008
- Exhibited at Fort Gallery, Oakland, California as part of Artcycle, from June 6 to June 27, 2008

== Documentary ==
A short documentary was made about Salleé, titled Frameline Voices: Altered Lives of LaVonne Salleé.
