= Georgy Arzumanian =

Georgian-Armenian chess grandmaster (born 1981)

Personal information
- Born: August 16, 1981 (age 44) Tbilisi, Georgian SSR

Chess career
- Country: Armenia (until 2024); Austria (since 2024)
- Title: Grandmaster (2009)
- FIDE rating: 2457 (July 2026)
- Peak rating: 2504 (January 2009)

Georgy Arzumanian (born August 16, 1981 in Tbilisi) is a Georgian-Armenian chess grandmaster. Since 2009 he has the title grandmaster.

== Biography ==
He was born in 1981 in Georgian SSR and achieved his peak ranking in 2009 at 2504.

Georgy Arzumanian lives in Ukraine.

In October 2005 he won in Charkov with 7.5 points out of 11 games the Femida 2005 chess tournament.

In Ukraine he played for the chess team of the Law University in Charkov. With this team he won in 2007 the sixth championship for university teams, which was held in Istanbul. In Germany he plays since 2015 for Schachclub Siegburg.

He attained the title International Master (IM) in 2001. Norms for the title grandmaster (GM) he fulfilled in January 2007 at the Stek-Friday tournament in Tula, in October 2005 at the Femida 2005 tournament in Charkov and in November 2006 at the second Memorial tournament in Tula, which was held to honour the late grandmaster Alexei Suetin who had died in 2001. The Suetin Memorial was won by Arzumanian. The request for receiving the GM title was filed in November 2007. Granting the title took place after Arzumanian's Elo rating had fulfilled the requirement of passing 2500, which happened in January 2009.
