= A. Lavonne Brown Ruoff =

American writer and academic (born 1930)

A. LaVonne Brown Ruoff (born 1930) is an American writer and academic, known for her work collecting and analyzing literature of Native American writers. She was instrumental in establishing the academic discipline of Native American literature. Ruoff wrote what UT Arlington professor Kenneth Roemer called the '"bible" of the field, her 1990 volume American Indian Literatures, which surveys oral and written literatures. Chippewa author and UC Berkeley professor Gerald Vizenor has commented about Ruoff's work, "She has done more for Native American literature than anyone in history... She's done it with determination and brilliance.".

== Personal life ==
Born in Harvey, Illinois, Ruoff, a non-native, was surround by Native American culture as a child, through stories she heard from her father, a cowboy and homesteader in North Dakota, who also managed a traveling American Indian baseball team that played on the Native American team circuit. Ruoff's first husband was Milford Prasher, a Menominee and a World War II veteran. They were married for 14 years, during which time they adopted two children, including a daughter who is Ojibwa. In June 1967, Ruoff married her second husband, Gene W. Ruoff, a professor of English and administrator at UIC. He died in 2020.

== Career ==
Ruoff earned her BS in education and an MA (1954) and PhD (1966) in English at Northwestern University. She taught first at Roosevelt University. Then beginning in 1969 she taught English literature in the English department at the University of Illinois at Chicago, where she developed curriculum for a Native American studies program. In addition, for 26 years, she served on the board of advisors for a federally funded program at UIC that supports Native American students by such acts as developing a special section of first-year composition that is "designed to address the needs and interests of native students". This started her hunt to find materials by Native American authors for students to read. She is a professor emerita of English at UIC, which she retired from in 1994.

Ruoff served on the University of Nebraska Press’s American Indian Lives series, as the Editorial Board General Editor from 1985 to 2008.

She served as the acting director from 1999 to 2000 of the D'Arcy McNickle Center for American Indian and Indigenous Studies, a part of the Newberry Library.

== Awards ==
She received a grant from the National Endowment for the Humanities Research Division in 1981.

She was a Fellow of the National Endowment for the Humanities (1992-1993).

Ruoff was a National Endowment for the Humanities director of Summer Seminars for College Teachers on American Indian Literature, in 1979, 1983, 1989, and 1994.

She was a recipient of the Lifetime Achievement Award from the Before Columbus Foundation in 1998.

In 2002, Ruoff won the Modern Language Association Award for Lifetime Scholarly Achievement.

In 2005, a festschrift special issue of Studies in American Indian Literatures was published honoring Ruoff.

== Key publications ==
- Ruoff, A. LaVonne Brown (1978). "Ritual and Renewal: Keres Traditions in the Short Fiction of Leslie Silko". MELUS. 5 (4): 2–17. doi:10.2307/467292. JSTOR 467292.
- — (1985). "Gerald Vizenor: Compassionate Trickster". American Indian Quarterly. 9 (1): 67–73. doi:10.2307/1184655. JSTOR 1184655.
- — (1990). "Three Nineteenth-Century American Indian Autobiographers". In Ruoff, A. Lavonne Brown; Ward, Jerry W. Jr. (eds.). Redefining American Literary History. New York, NY: Modern Language Association of America.
- —; Ward, Jerry Washington Jr., eds. (1990). Redefining American Literary History. New York, NY: Modern Language Association of America.
- — (1990). American Indian Literatures: An Introduction, Bibliographic Review and Selected Bibliography. New York, NY: Modern Language Association of America.
- — (1992). "Justice for Indians and Women: The Protest Fiction of Alice Callahan and Pauline Johnson". World Literature Today. 66 (2): 249–255. doi:10.2307/40148127. JSTOR 40148127.
- — (1996). "Foreword". In Jaskoski, Helen; Gelpi, Albert; Posnock, Ross (eds.). Early Native American Writing: New Critical Essays. Cambridge: Cambridge University Press.
- — (2000). "Introduction". In Kenny, Maurice (ed.). Stories for a Winter's Night: Short Fiction by Native Americans. Buffalo, NY: White Pines Press.
