= Levon Tumanyan =

Member of the State Duma of the Russian Empire

- Լևոն Թումանյան
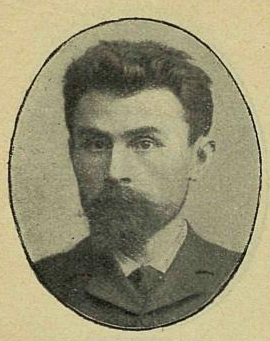
- Born: 1869; Ashtarak, Erivan Governorate, Russian Empire
- Died: 1942 (aged 72–73); Ashtarak, Armenian Soviet Socialist Republic
- Education: Lazarev Institute of Oriental Languages
- Known for: Deputy of the State Duma, 1906
- Political party: Constitutional Democratic Party
- Father: Philippos Tumanyan

Signature
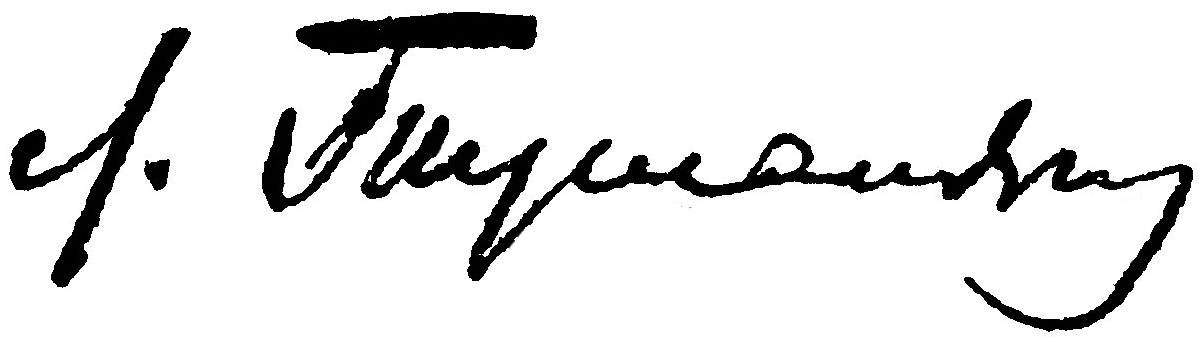

Levon Tumanyan (Armenian: Լևոն Թումանյան, 1869–1942) was a deputy of the State Duma of the Russian Empire of the first convocation from Erivan Governorate.

== Biography ==
Levon Tumanyan was born in 1869 in the town of Ashtarak, studied at Lazarev Institute of Oriental Languages in Moscow, where since 1892 courses of legal sciences were introduced for those who wished to attend together with the students of the Moscow university. However, after the 5th year, he had to stop his education and in 1897 he returned to his motherland, worked as a private lawyer in civil and criminal cases. He did translations. In 1899 his translation of "The Song of the Falcon" (Russian: «Песня о Соколе») was printed in the magazine "Murch".

Levon Tumanyan was a member of the Constitutional Democratic Party. He signed the Vyborg Manifesto on the 10th of July 1906 in Vyborg, and in December 1907 was convicted under Art. 129, part 1, p.p. 51 and 3 of the Criminal Code for 3 months in prison and disenfranchised.

Later, he was engaged in professional (legal) activities.

He was buried in the family cemetery in the town of Ashtarak, Armenia.

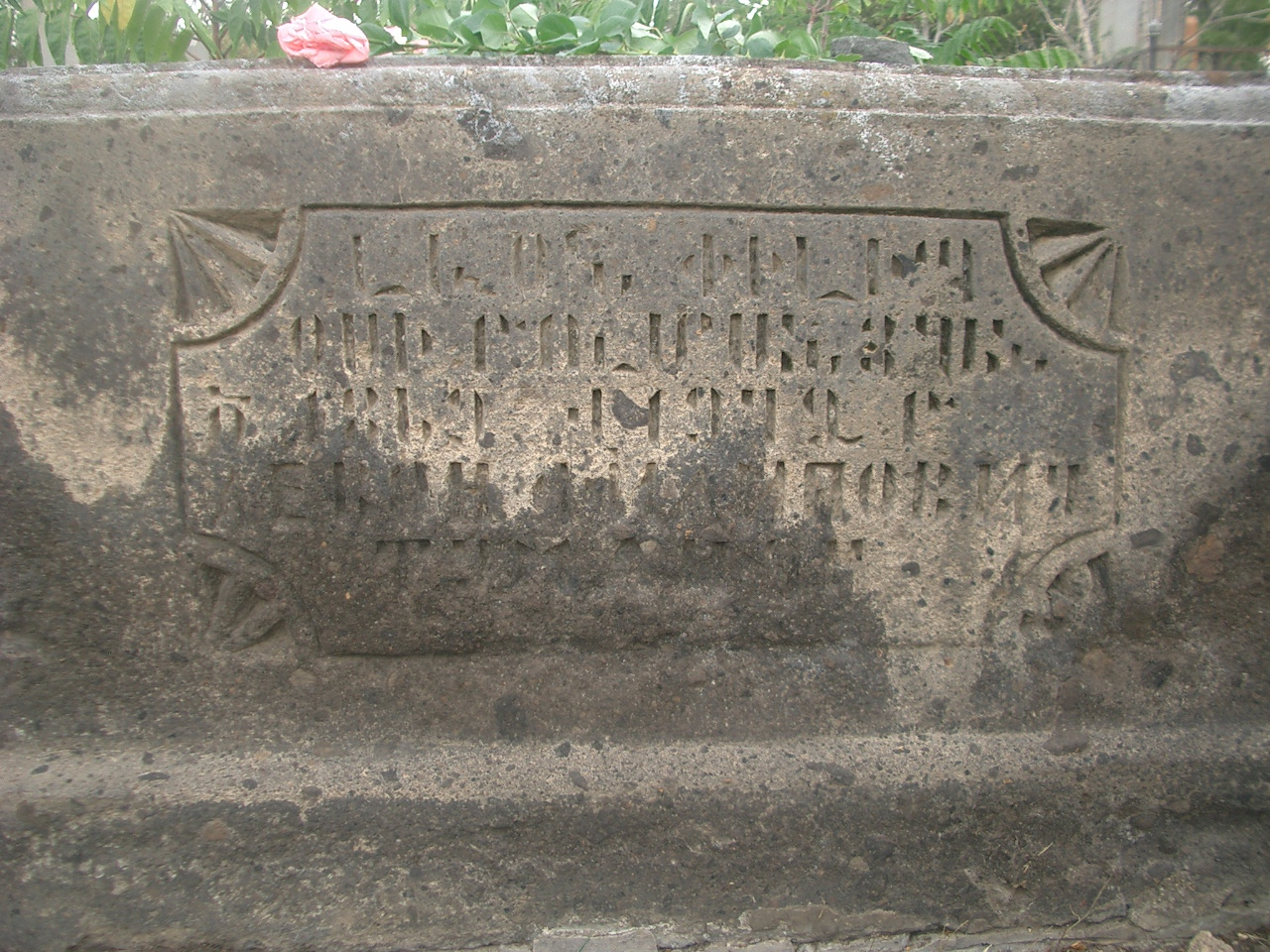
The grave of Levon Tumanyan in Ashtarak
