= Leon Monde =

American baseball player

Leon Monde (New York City; January 8, 1895 – after May 1931) was an American basketball player for the New York Renaissance (commonly known as the "Rens"). Monde was a veteran of Negro league baseball, and was one of the first players for the Rens. In 1922, the Metropolitan Basketball Association (MBA) ordered Monde's suspension from the Rens (then competing under their original name, the Spartan Braves) for having played baseball professionally, but the team refused. In 1963, the New York Renaissance franchise was inducted into the Naismith Memorial Basketball Hall of Fame.

Monde's draft registration card of June 1917 listed his residence as being on Cleveland Street in Brooklyn and was employed as a "machine hand". In April 1930, Monde and his wife moved from Brooklyn to Eatontown, New Jersey. In 1931, he started a business of tea and coffee.
