= Lavonne Adams =

American poet

Lavonne J. Adams is a published poet and writer living in Durham, North Carolina. Adams grew up in Norfolk, Virginia, but has lived in North Carolina for over 30 years. Adams taught and was the MFA Coordinator in the Department of Creative Writing at the University of North Carolina Wilmington.

== Education ==
Adams has three degrees from UNCW. She earned her BA in 1986, followed by her MA in English in 1992. In 1999, she earned her MFA in poetry, making her one of the first to graduate from UNCW's Creative Writing graduate program. During her time there, Adams studied with visiting Writer-in-Residence Philip Levine, who was the United States Poet Laureate.

== Publications ==
Adams' poems have been published in over fifty venues, including Artful Dodge,The Southern Poetry Review, Missouri Review, and Poet Lore. Her first published collection, a 36-page chapbook entitled Everyday Still Life, consists mostly of poems written during her time in graduate school. Her next chapbook, In the Shadow of the Mountain, was published five years later. centering on the deadly 1902 eruption of Mount Pelée, it contains many historically-based poems written from the point of view of locals before, during, and after the eruption. Adams' most recently published collection is Through the Glorieta Pass. This book contains historical poetry about the Santa Fe Trail in the time when pioneers were settling the Wild West, drawing upon journals and other records of pioneer, Hispanic, and Native American women. Adams traveled to gather additional information in Santa Fe, New Mexico, and along what remains of the trail.

== Awards and recognition ==
Adams was the recipient of the Persephone Poetry Prize for her chapbook Everyday Still Life, as well as the Randall Jarrell/Harperprints Chapbook Award for In the Shadow of the Mountain. Adams' poetry collection Through the Glorieta Pass won the 2007 Pearl Poetry Prize.

North Carolina Poet Laureate Kathryn Stripling Byer said the following about Through the Glorieta Pass:

Lavonne J. Adams's mesmerizing Through the Glorieta Pass weaves a chorus of women's voices into a poetic tapestry through which human longing, determination, and landscape itself speak to us. With authority and integrity, Adams has brought both the beauty and the danger along the Santa Fe Trail to life in her poems. On this journey westward, transformation was inevitable. The ways of the Apaches and the Mexicans mingled with the lives of the settlers. Out of that medicine bag of history has come poetry that speaks to the heart.

Adams was awarded Artist-in-Residence at the Helene Wurlitzer Foundation Residency, Taos, NM Summer 2009. She was awarded a Fellowship from the Vermont Studio in 2009, and Artist-in-Residence, Harwood Museum of Art, University of New Mexico, Taos in 2007.
