= Yuri Arzumanyan =

Russian spacecraft engineer (born 1952)

Yuri Lazarevich Arzumanyan
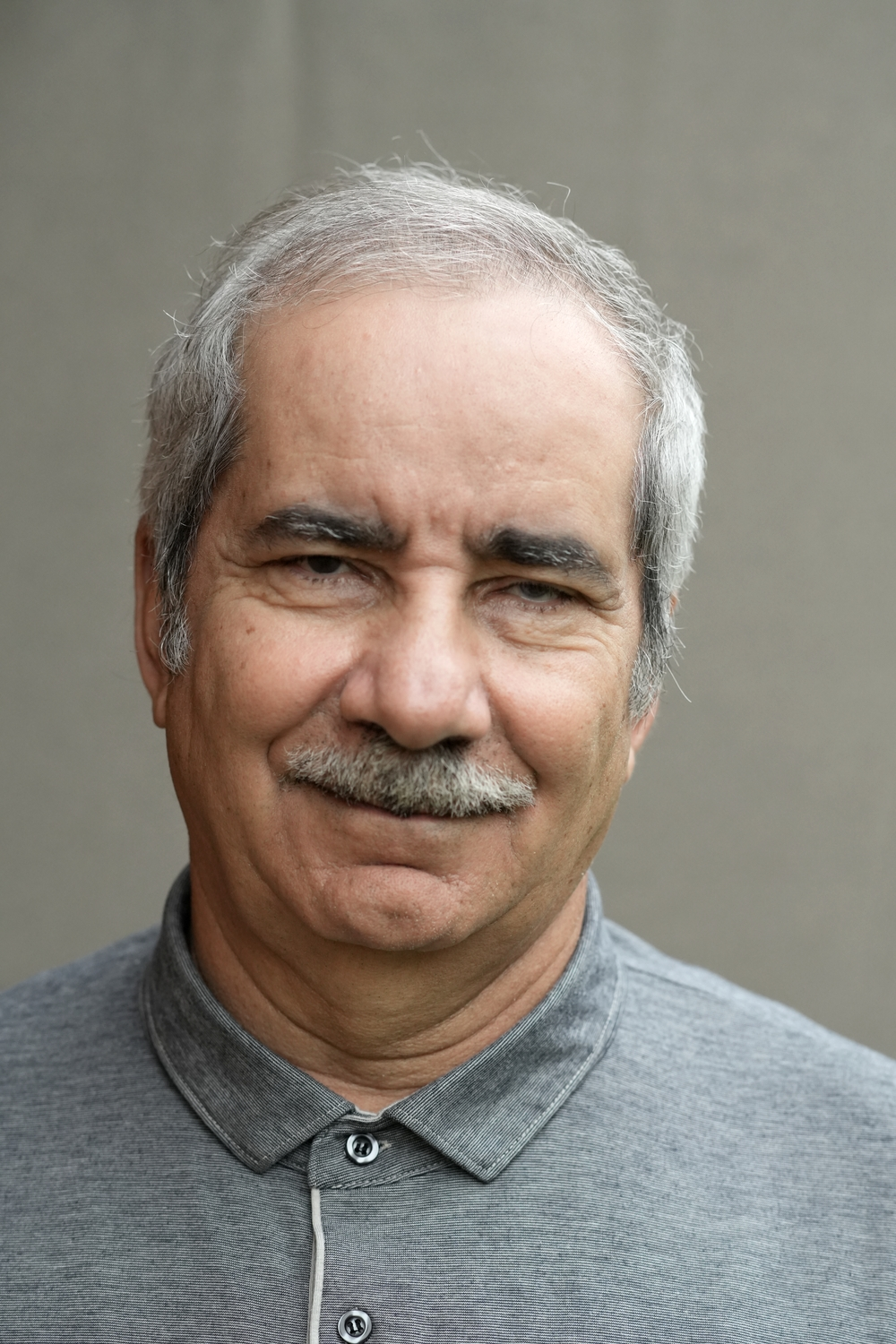
- Born: September 9, 1952 (age 73); Samarkand, USSR
- Citizenship: USSR; Russian Federation
- Education: Moscow Aviation Institute
- Occupations: Aerospace engineering; Rocket technologies

Yuri Lazarevich Arzumanyan (Russian: Юрий Лазаревич Арзуманян, IPA: [Jˈuːɹi Lˈæzɛ͡ɹvˌɪt͡ʃ ˌAː͡ɹzjuːmˈænjən]; born 9 September 1952) is a Soviet and Russian spacecraft engineer known for his prominent role in developing launch vehicle systems and promoting international space collaborations.

== Life and career ==
Arzumanyan was born 9 September 1952 in Samarkand, Uzbekistan, USSR. In 1975, Yuri Arzumanyan graduated from the Moscow Aviation Institute with a degree in Aerospace Engeniiring and a special focus on space launch vehicles and spacecraft. In 1976–1977, he attended the Dnepropetrovsk State University, now the Oles Honchar Dnipro National University, to improve his English language skills. His space studies were later continues at the Moscow Institute of Heat Technology, where he submitted research work for the Lenkom Award nomination.

Arzumanyan began his career at the Yangel Yuzhnoe Design Office, а structure known today as KB Pivdene in Ukraine (1975–1978), where he contributed to the design of various launch and missile systems. From 1978 to 1980, he was Head of Aircraft Technical Services and Maintenance Team at the Uzbek branch of Aeroflot airlines responsible for heavy maintenance of Antonov An-24 and Antonov An-26 aircraft.

In 1980, he proceeded to join the Moscow Aviation Institute as Senior Engineer (1980–1981). The next phase of his career took him to the Moscow Institute of Thermal Technology, where from 1981 to 1995 he worked his way up from Senior Engineer and Lead Engineer to Deputy head of International Cooperation. During this period, Arzumanyan played a key role in the conversion of ballistic missiles into commercial launch vehicles under the US-Soviet Strategic Arms Reduction Treaty.

Notably, he led the team responsible for the development and commercialization of the Start-1 space launch vehicle project. At a later phase, he was appointed Deputy Head for International Cooperation, securing several Israeli and US contracts.

In 1996, Arzumanyan co-founded OOO Aerospace Technologies (ASTEK), to join efforts with satellite companies from Sweden, Brazil, and Australia. He was invited to share his spacecraft design expertise as a consultant to the Australian Space Agency and assumed the essential role of Technical Coordinator for the United Launch Systems International project in Australia, overseeing the development of design specifications for Unity Launch Vehicle in synergy with an international team of experts. Arzumanyan supervised the design process and took charge of customer acceptance.

In 2002, he joined the Transport Machinery Design Bureau (KBTM) as Deputy CEO for International Projects. In this capacity, Arzumanyan contributed to major space initiatives such as the Sea Launch, Land Launch, Dnepr, Tsyklon-2K, and the Korea Space Launch Vehicle (2002–2009). He kept his role in 2009, after KBTM merged with a larger organization, the Ground Space Infrastructure Operation Centre (TsENKI). Arzumanyan took over the responsibility for all the international projects of the enterprise, working with partners in the USA, France, Germany, Italy, Denmark, China, South Korea, Australia, Indonesia, Brazil, Ukraine, Kazakhstan, and other agencies across the globe. In addition to ongoing programs such as Sea Launch and KSLV, he supervised the Soyuz series of launches at the Guiana Space Centre (France), the Aurora program in Christmas Island, Australia, and the Ukrainian satellite program (Lybid).

From 2016 to 2019, he held the position of Commercial Director at S7 Space Transportation Systems, where he oversaw the Sea Launch and Land Launch projects. In this capacity, he played a lead role in the development of space transportation systems.

== Achievements ==
Arzumanyan is the author of a numerous articles in scientific magazines and papers for presented at international space conferences.

In collaboration with his colleagues at Astek, he created the seminal Russian-English Aerospace Reference Dictionary, and at a later phase published a research paper on outer space defense programs.

- Russian Aerospace Reference Dictionary. Aerospace Techno, Y.L. Arzumanyan; A.V. Grigor'ev; S.L. Solomonov. English logies: Moscow, 1998, ISBN 5-89338-003-7;
- US space missile defense and prospects for Russian-American cooperation, E.A. Rogovsky, Y.L. Arzumanyan, Editorial and Publishing Department ISKRAN, Moscow, 2004, ISBN 5-89587-073-2

Yuri Arzumanyan holds several Russian patents in the fields of aerospace engineering, mobility systems, internal combustion engines, and industrial design.

- RU 2008 111 187 "Spaceport Designed to Minimize Negative Environmental Impact";
- RU 2 322 587 "Turborotary Machine (with Versions)";
- RU 2 326 219 "A method for parking a vehicle and a low-cost, easily-constructed transformable parking system, which transitions from a single-level to a double-level structure, designed with anti-theft functionality".

Yuri Arzumanyan is a certified International Umpire for table tennis, recognized by the International Table Tennis Federation (ITTF).

== Awards ==
Yuri Arzumanyan’s commitment to scientific research earned him the Lenin Komsomol Award as early as in 1987.
