= Kenneth Roemer =

American academic

Kenneth Morrison Roemer
- Born: 6 June 1945 (age 81); East Rockaway, New York, United States
- Education: Harvard, B.A., 1967; University of Pennsylvania; M.A., 1968; PhD 1971
- Occupations: Teacher; Writer
- Spouse(s): Claire (Micki) Roemer (m. 1968 – present); Retired, Gen. Mgr., Schools Services & Training Channel; Federal Student Aid; U.S. Dept. of Education

Kenneth Morrison Roemer (born 6 June 1945, in East Rockaway, Long Island), an Emeritus Professor at the University of Texas at Arlington, an Emeritus Fellow, UT System Academy of Distinguished Teachers, and a former Piper Professor of 2011, Distinguished Scholar Professor, and Distinguished Teaching Professor at the University of Texas at Arlington. He is the author or editor of four books on utopian literature, including The Obsolete Necessity (1976, 2024), nominated for a Pulitzer, and three books on American Indian literatures, including the co-edited Cambridge Companion to Native American Literature (2005). His collection of personal essays about Japan, Michibata de Dietta Nippon (2002) (A Sidewalker’s Japan), was a finalist for the Koizumi Yakumo Cultural Prize. He is the project director of a searchable digital archive: Covers, Titles, and Tables: The Formations of American Literary Canons and Concepts of America in Anthologies, Histories and Scholarship (https://mavmatrix.uta.edu/exhibit/ctt).

== Background ==
=== Family ===
Kenneth Roemer's father Arthur K. Roemer (1912–2005), was an engineer and co-inventor of the stabilizer for the klystron tube that produced narrow band microwave messages that were difficult for the Japanese to intercept during WW II (Patent No. 2,503,266, April 11, 1950). His mother, Mildred Allison Roemer (1906–2003), was an artist and author of Brandy: Diary of a Guide Dog (Forest Hills: Guide Dog Foundation for the Blind, 1975) and East Rockaway. It Happened Here (n.d.: self published). Her activism for Native Americans included clothing and medical supplies drives, protesting reservation jurisdiction injustices to J. Edgar Hoover, and publicizing compensation delays for reservation land lost to dam projects.

Roemer married Claire "Micki" O’Keefe Roemer (1946 – ), former district director of Financial Aid for Tarrant County College in Texas, former President of the Board of the National Association of Financial Aid Administrators (NASFAA), and former General Manager, School Services and Training Channel, Financial Aid, US Department of Education. They have two children and four grandchildren.

=== Education ===
East Rockaway High School (1959–1963); Harvard College, B.A., cum laude, English (1963–67); University of Pennsylvania, M.A., PhD, American Civilization (1967–1971); Yale University (1982: FIPSE Institute, Reconstructing American Literature).

=== Career ===
During his college years, Roemer worked as a farmhand on the Underhill sod and hay farm in Jericho, Long Island, New York. In 1965 he was a recreation co-supervisor for summer programs at the Gallup Indian Community Center in Gallup, New Mexico. From 1967 through 1970, at the University of Pennsylvania, he had part-time positions as Assistant Editor of American Quarterly, a Teaching Assistant, and a Research Assistant in Veterinary Medicine and Immunology. Since 1971 Roemer has taught at the University of Texas at Arlington where, from 1971 to 1978, he was managing Editor of American Literary Realism. From 1995 to 2019, he was Advisor for the Native American Students Association at UT Arlington. He still advises informally. Roemer has been a visiting professor in Japan at Shimane University (1982–1983) and International Christian University (1988), a guest lecturer at Harvard (1993), and a Senior Fellow for the Japan Society for the Promotion of Science (1988). With the USIA Ampart Program (1988) and the USIA Academic Specialist Program (1991), he lectured in Austria, Portugal, Turkey, and Brazil. Between 1886 and 2010 he also lectured in Italy, Canada, Germany, Ireland, Hong Kong and France and co-directed a seminar on utopian literature at the European Forum Alpbach (Austria, 2008).

== Selected awards, grants, and honors ==
- 1977 Exxon Education Foundation, IMPACT Grant
- 1992 National Endowment for the Humanities, to Direct Summer Native Literature Seminar (also awarded in 1994, 1996, 1998)
- 1998 Writer of the Year (Reference), Wordcraft Circle of Native Writers and Storytellers
- 1998 Academy of Distinguished Teachers Award (UT Arlington)
- 2005 Academy of Distinguished Scholars Award (UT Arlington)
- 2008 Writer of the Year (Reference), Wordcraft Circle of Native writers and Storytellers
- 2008 Lyman Tower Sargent Distinguished Scholarship Award, Society for Utopian Studies
- 2010 Kenneth M. Roemer Innovative Courses Design Award (named in his honor), Society for Utopian Studies
- 2011 Regents' Outstanding Teaching Award (UT System)
- 2011 Piper Professor Award, Minnie Stevens Piper Foundation (Texas)
- 2014 UT System Academy of Distinguished Teachers Award
- 2021 First Place, national contest, Nonfiction Book Manuscript Award, Mayborn Literary Nonfiction Conference

== Selected publications ==
=== Selected books ===
- The Obsolete Necessity: America in Utopian Writings, 1988-1900. Kent: Kent State UP, 1976. Nominated for a Pulitzer in American History by the Editor of the Arno Press-NY Times Utopian Literature Collection; Ralahine Classics in Utopian Studies Edition. Oxford: Ralahine-Peter Lang, 2024.
- America as Utopia (ed.). New York: Burt Franklin, 1981.
- Build Your Own Utopia: An Interdisciplinary Course in Utopian Speculation: Washington: UP of America, 1981. (textbook)
- Approaches to Teaching Momaday’s The Way to Rainy Mountain (ed.). New York: Modern Language Assoc., 1988.
- Native American Writers of the United States, ed., Vol. 175 of the Dictionary of Literary Biography. Detroit; Gale Research, 1997.
- Michibata de Deatta Nippon [A Sidewalker’s Japan]. Tokyo: Sairyusha, 2002. (personal narrative)
- Utopian Audiences: How Readers Locate Utopia. Amherst: U of Massachusetts P, 2003.
- The Cambridge Companion to Native American Literature, co-ed. Cambridge: Cambridge UP, 2005.

=== Selected recent articles / chapters ===
- "Paradise Transformed: Varieties of Nineteenth-Century Utopias". Ed. Gregory Claeys. The Cambridge Companion to Utopian Literature. New York: Cambridge UP. 2010. 79–106.
- "It’s Not a Poem. It’s My Life: Navajo Singing Identities". Studies in American Indian Literatures NS 24.2 (2012): 84–103.
- "Making Do: Momaday’s Survivance Ceremonies". Studies in American Indian Literatures NS 24.4 (2012). 77–98.
- "Reverse Assimilation: Native Appropriations of Euro-American Conventions". The Routledge Companion to Native American Literature. Ed. Deborah Madsen. New York: Routledge, 2016. 390–401.
- "Naming Native (Living) Histories: Erdrich’s Plague of Names". Studies in American Fiction 43.1 (2016). 115–35.
- "The Storyteller's Universe: Indigenous Oral Literatures". Ed.Theresa Strouth Gaul. A Companion to American Literature, Vol. 1. New York: Wiley, 2020. 1–18.
- "Murder She Wrote, and Re-Wrote, and Re-Wrote: A Trilogy of Justices." Ed. Connie Jacobs and Nancy Peterson. Louise Erdrich's Justice Trilogy: Cultural and Critical Contexts. East Lancing: U of Michigan State P. 2021. 17–42.
- "An Irrelevant/Relevant Recovery: A Cultural Artifact and the Origin of Scholarly Impact." Kenneth Roemer. The Obsolete Necessity: America in Utopian Writings, 1888-1900. Oxford: Ralahine Classics-Peter Lang. 2024.1-40.
- “What If a Late-Nineteenth Century Utopia Inspired the President?” American Literary Realism 58.1 (2025): 88-91.
- “Meet the “more immediate and intense” Ursula K. Le Guin.” Utopian Studies 36.3 (2025): 693-716.
