= Brne Karnarutić =

Venetian poet

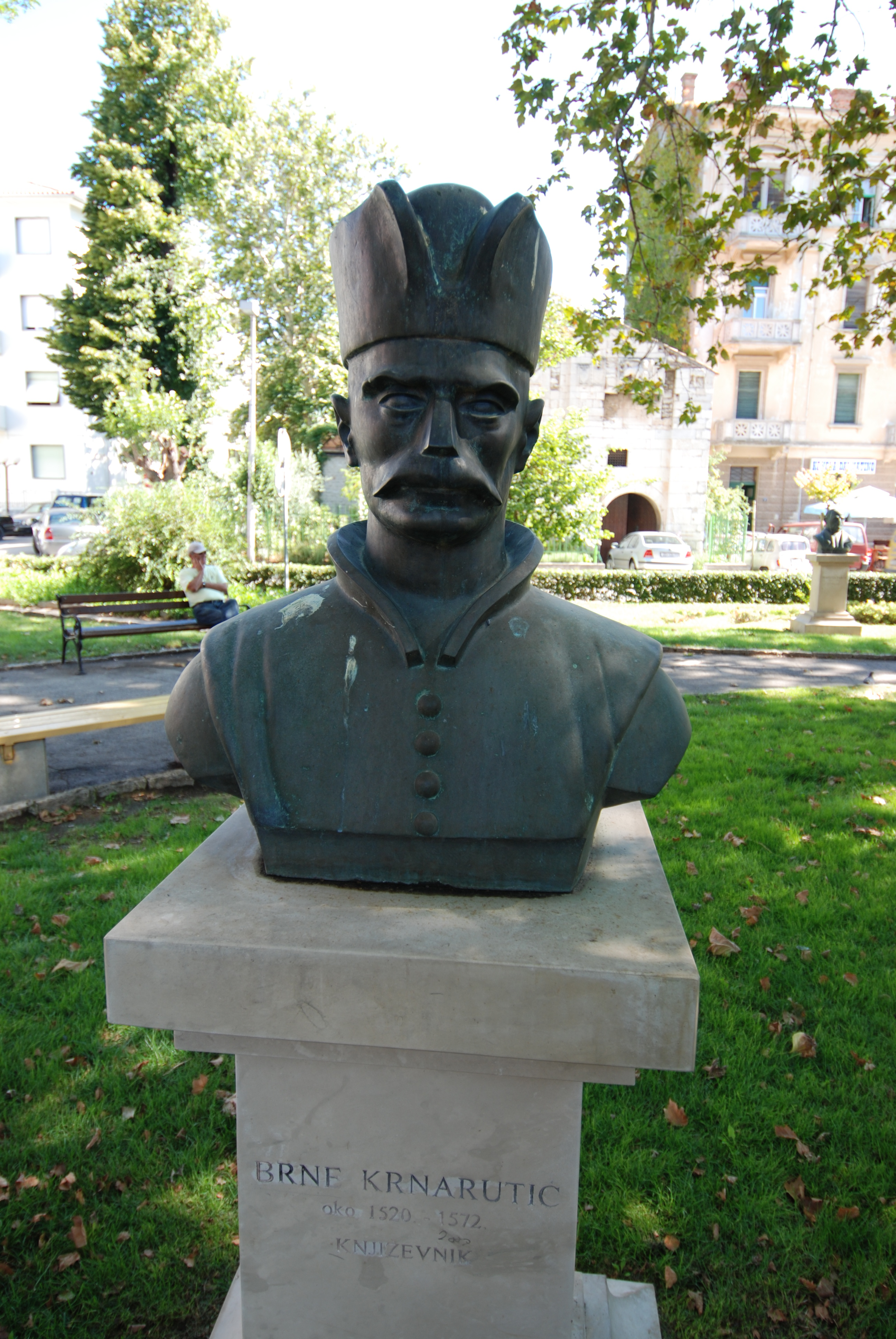
- A statue of Brne Karnarutić in Zadar
- Born: 1515; Zadar, Venetian Republic
- Died: 1573 (aged 57–58)
- Occupation: poet
- Notable work: Vazetje Sigeta grada

Brne Karnarutić (1515–1573) was a Croatian Renaissance poet. His most famous work was Vazetje Sigeta grada, a historical epic on the Siege of Szigetvár (1566).

== Life ==
He was born in Zadar, in 1515 or somewhere between 1515 and 1520, to an old noble family, at a time of the Republic of Venice. After schooling in Zadar he studied law, probably in Padua. He served as a captain in the Venetian army, leading a Croatian cavalry squad in the Ottoman–Venetian War (1537–1540). Afterwards he worked as a lawyer and duke's advisor in Zadar, where he died between 2 February and 27 August in 1573.

== Works ==
He adapted Ovid's metamorphosis on Pyramus and Thisbe under the title of Izvrsita ljubav i napokon nemila i nesrićna smrt Pirama i Tizbe (Venice, 1586). Much more famous is Karnarutić's other work - Vazetje Sigeta grada (Venice, 1584), the first Croatian historical epic on the Siege of Szigetvár and the death of Nikola IV Zrinski and courageous defenders of Szigetvár (1566).
