= Levon Khechoyan =

Armenian writer and novelist

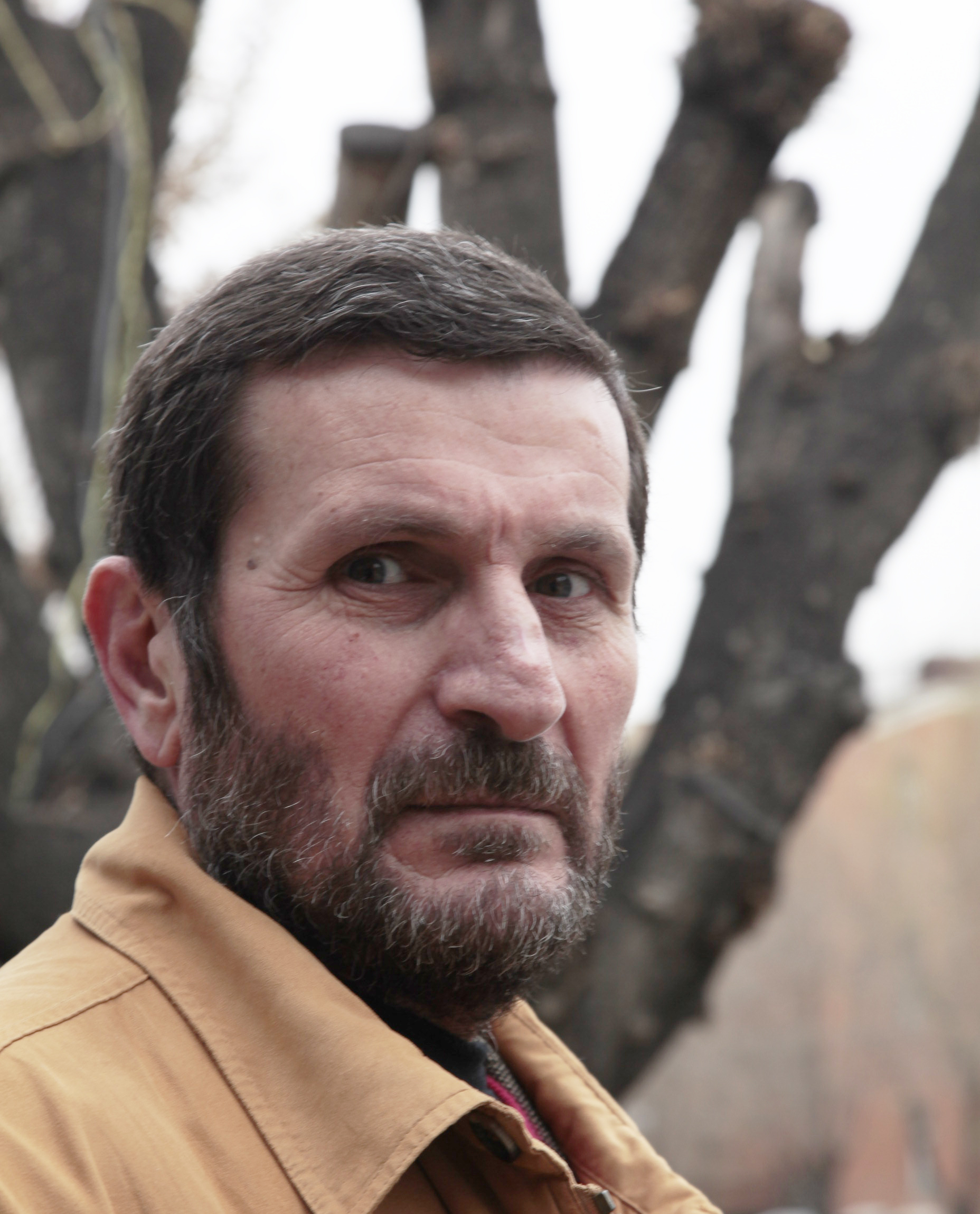
- Born: December 8, 1955; Baraleti, Akhalkalaki district, Georgian SSR
- Died: 8 January 2014 (aged 58)
- Occupations: Writer and novelist

Levon Khechoyan (Armenian: Լևոն Խեչոյան; 8 December 1955 – 8 January 2014) was an Armenian writer and novelist.

== Biography ==
Khechoyan was born in the village of Baraleti, Akhalkalaki district, Georgian SSR. Since 1987 he lived and worked in Hrazdan, Armenia. In 1983 he graduated from the Gyumri State Pedagogical Institute receiving an M.A. in philology. Khechoyan participated in the first Artsakh War.

He started writing as a teenager, and his first collection of short stories, Trees of Incense, was published in 1991. Khechoyan is the author of historical novel King Arshak and Eunuch Drastamat. Many of his works have been translated into Russian, English and Ukrainian. In 2000, he received the Gold Reed literary award for his book ‘Black Book, Heavy Bug’.

In 2013, he refused to accept the Medal for Services to the Homeland granted by President Serzh Sargsyan in protest against the socioeconomic and political situation in the country.
