= LaVon (given name) =

LaVon is a given name. Notable people with the name include:

- LaVon Brazill (born 1989), American football player
- LaVon Crosby (1924–2016), American politician
- Lavon Heidemann (born 1958), American politician
- LaVon Mercer (born 1959), American-Israeli basketball player
- Lavon Volski (born 1965), Belarusian musician and writer

== See also ==
- Levon (name), given name and surname
- LaVonne (name)
