= Salt spray test =

Corrosion test method

The salt spray test (or salt fog test) is a standardized and popular corrosion test method, used to check corrosion resistance of materials and surface coatings. Usually, the materials to be tested are metallic (although stone, ceramics, and polymers may also be tested) and finished with a surface coating which is intended to provide a degree of corrosion protection to the underlying metal.

Salt spray testing is an accelerated corrosion test that produces a corrosive attack to coated samples in order to evaluate (mostly comparatively) the suitability of the coating for use as a protective finish. The appearance of corrosion products (rust or other oxides) is evaluated after a predetermined period of time. Test duration depends on the corrosion resistance of the coating; generally, the more corrosion resistant the coating is, the longer the period of testing before the appearance of corrosion or rust.

The salt spray test is one of the most widespread and long-established corrosion tests. ASTM B117 was the first internationally recognized salt spray standard, originally published in 1939. Other important relevant standards are ISO 9227, JIS Z 2371 and ASTM G85.

== Application ==
Salt spray testing is popular because it is relatively inexpensive, quick, well standardized, and reasonably repeatable. Although there may be a weak correlation between the duration in salt spray test and the expected life of a coating in certain coatings such as hot-dip galvanized steel, this test has gained worldwide popularity due to low cost and quick results. Most salt spray chambers today are not being used to predict the corrosion resistance of a coating, but to maintain coating processes such as pre-treatment and painting, electroplating, galvanizing, and the like, on a comparative basis. For example, pre-treated + painted components must pass 96 hours Neutral Salt Spray, to be accepted for production. Failure to meet this requirement implies instability in the chemical process of the pre-treatment, or the paint quality, which must be addressed immediately so that the upcoming batches are of the desired quality. The longer the accelerated corrosion test, the longer the process remains out of control, and larger is the loss in the form of non-conforming batches. The principal application of the salt spray test is, therefore, enabling quick comparisons to be made between actual and expected corrosion resistance. Most commonly, the time taken for oxides to appear on the samples under test is compared to expectations, to determine whether the test is passed or failed. For this reason, the salt spray test is most often deployed in a quality audit role, where, for example, it can be used to check the effectiveness of a production process, such as the surface coating of a metallic part. The salt spray test has little application in predicting how materials or surface coatings will resist corrosion in the real world, because it does not create, replicate or accelerate real-world corrosive conditions. Cyclic corrosion testing is better suited to this.

== Testing equipment ==
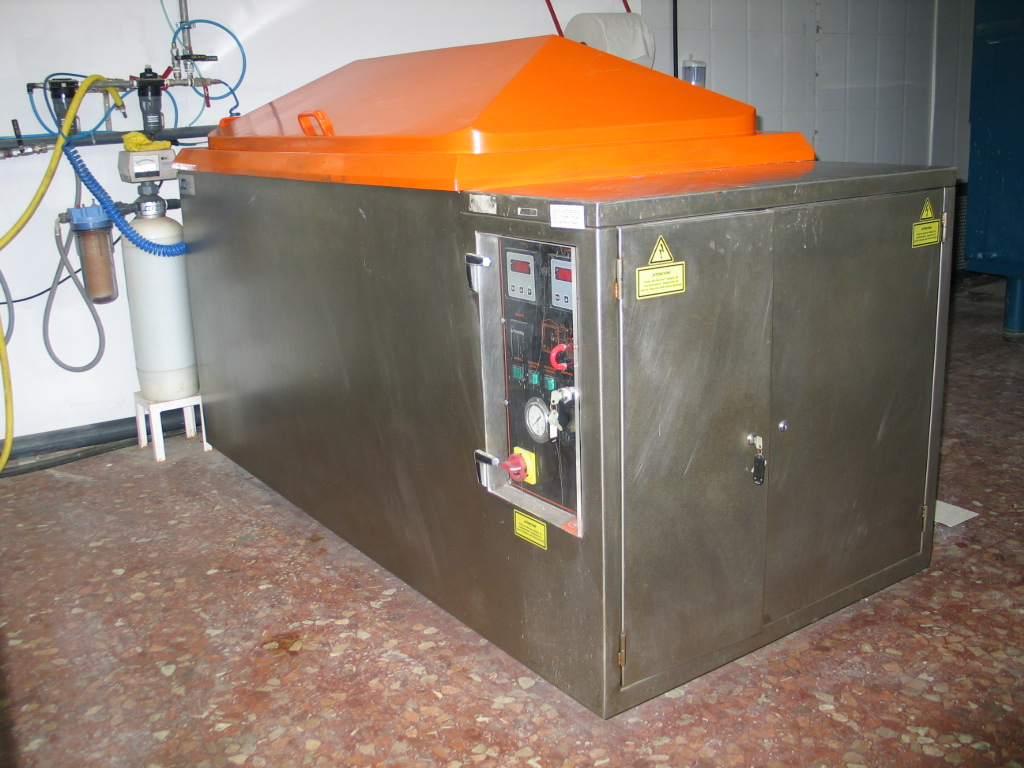
A salt spray cabinet

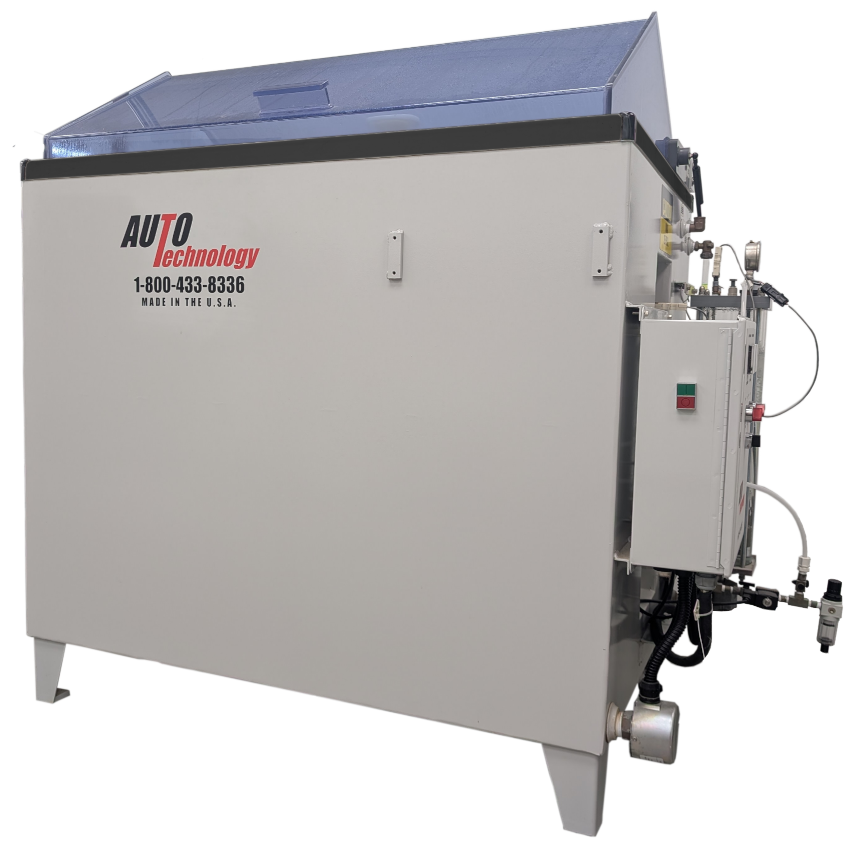
Steel salt fog corrosion test chamber (M Series) manufactured by Auto Technology Company, used for accelerated corrosion testing in accordance with standards such as ASTM B117 and ISO 9227.

The apparatus for testing consists of a closed testing cabinet/chamber, where a salt water (5% NaCl) solution is atomized by means of spray nozzle(s) using pressurized air. This produces a corrosive environment of dense salt water fog (also referred to as a mist or spray) in the chamber, so that test samples exposed to this environment are subjected to severely corrosive conditions. Chamber volumes vary from supplier to supplier. If there is a minimum volume required by a particular salt spray test standard, this will be clearly stated and should be complied with. There is a general historical consensus that larger chambers can provide a more homogeneous testing environment.

Variations to the salt spray test solutions depend upon the materials to be tested. The most common test for steel based materials is the Neutral Salt Spray test (often abbreviated to NSS) which reflects the fact that this type of test solution is prepared to a neutral pH of 6.5 to 7.2. To maintain a neutral pH, hydrochloric acid or sodium hydroxide are added to reduce or increase pH into the required range. Results are represented generally as testing hours in NSS without appearance of corrosion products (e.g. 720 h in NSS according to ISO 9227). Synthetic seawater solutions are also commonly specified by some companies and standards. Other test solutions have other chemicals added including acetic acid (often abbreviated to ASS) and acetic acid with copper chloride (often abbreviated to CASS) each one chosen for the evaluation of decorative coatings, such as electroplated copper-nickel-chromium, electroplated copper-nickel or anodized aluminum. These acidified test solutions generally have a pH of 3.1 to 3.3

Some sources do not recommend using ASS or CASS test cabinets interchangeably for NSS tests, due to the risk of cross-contamination. It is claimed that a thorough cleaning of the cabinet after CASS test is very difficult. ASTM does not address this issue, but ISO 9227 does not recommend it and if it is to be done, advocates a thorough cleaning.

Although the majority of salt spray tests are continuous, i.e.; the samples under test are exposed to the continuous generation of salt fog for the entire duration of the test, a few do not require such exposure. Such tests are commonly referred to as modified salt spray tests. ASTM G85 is an example of a test standard which contains several modified salt spray tests which are variations to the basic salt spray test.

== Modified salt spray tests ==
ASTM G85 is the most popular global test standard covering modified salt spray tests. There are five such tests altogether, referred to in ASTM G85 as annexes A1 through to A5.

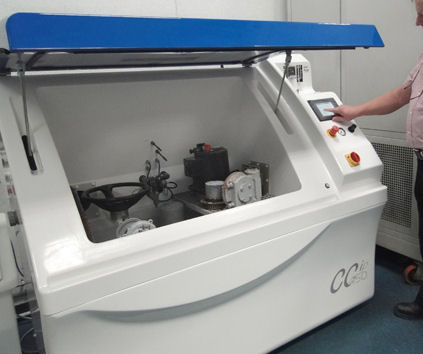
A modified salt spray chamber in use

Many of these modified tests originally arose within particular industry sector, in order to address the need for a corrosion test capable of replicating the effects of naturally occurring corrosion and accelerate these effects.

This acceleration arises through the use of chemically altered salt spray solutions, often combined with other test climates and in most cases, the relatively rapid cycling of these test climates over time. Although popular in certain industries, modified salt spray testing has in many cases been superseded by cyclic corrosion testing (CCT) The type of environmental test chambers used for modified salt spray testing to ASTM G85 are generally similar to the chambers used for testing to ASTM B117, but will often have some additional features, such as an automatic climate cycling control system.

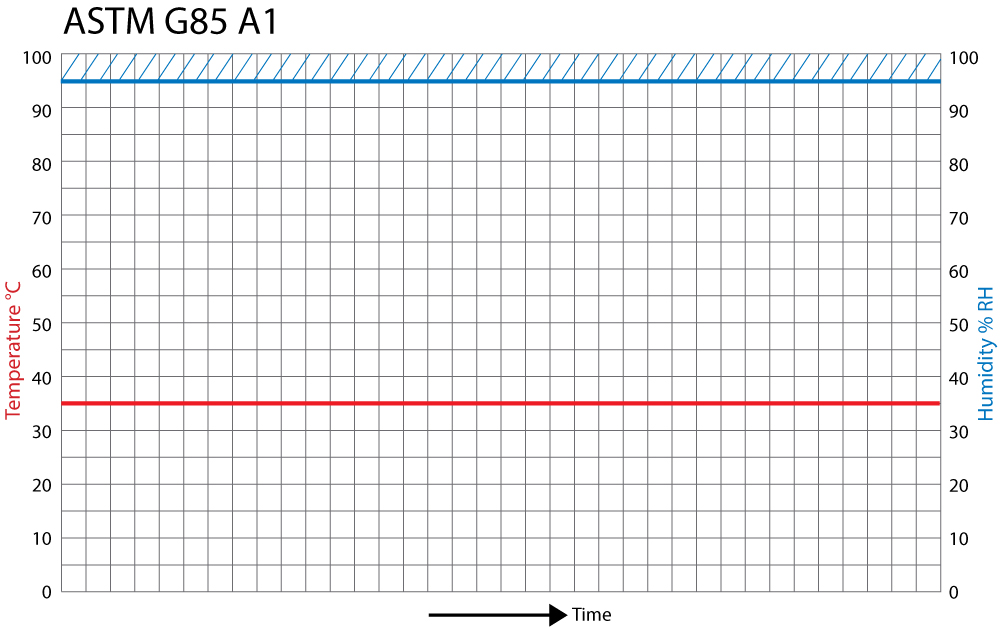
Graph showing the temperature & humidity steps required during modified Salt Spray Test ASTM G85 Annex 1

ASTM G85 Annex A1 – Acetic Acid Salt Spray Test (non-cyclic) This test can be used to determine the relative resistance to corrosion of decorative chromium plating on steel and zinc based die casting when exposed to an acetic acid salt spray climate at an elevated temperature. This test is also referred to as an ASS test. Test specimens are placed in an enclosed chamber and exposed to a continuous indirect spray of salt water solution, prepared in accordance with the requirements of the test standard and acidified (pH 3.1–3.3) by the addition of acetic acid. This spray is set to fall-out on to the specimens at a rate of 1–2 ml/80 cm^{2}/hour, in a chamber temperature of 35 °C. This climate is maintained under constant steady state conditions. The test duration is variable.

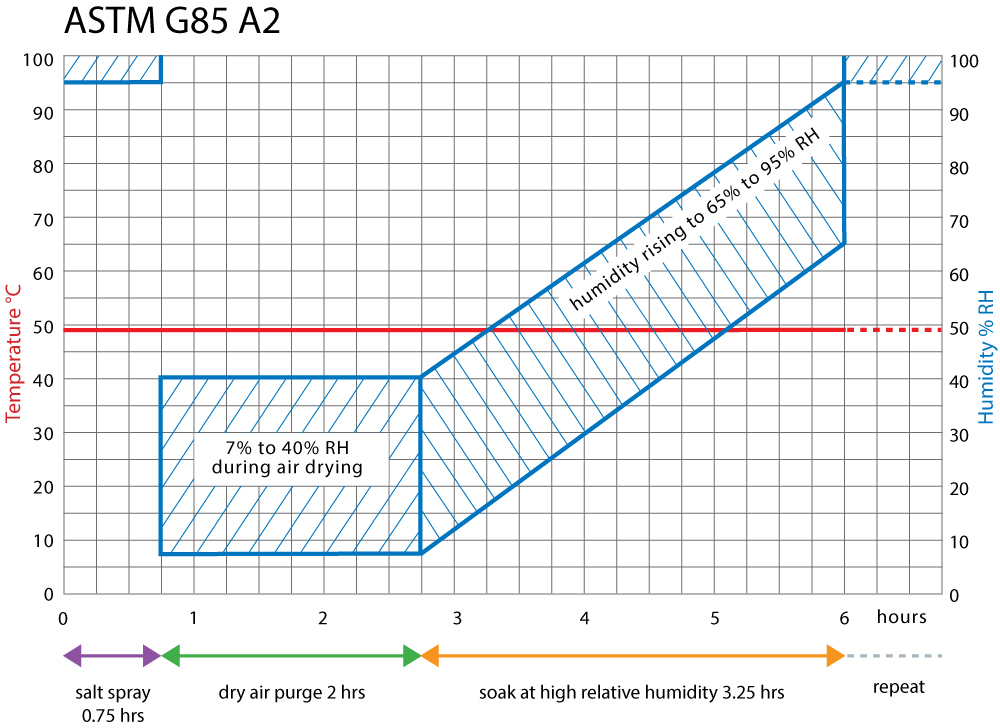
Graph showing the temperature & humidity steps required during modified Salt Spray Test ASTM G85 Annex 2

ASTM G85 Annex A2 – Acidified Salt Fog Test (cyclic).

This test can be used to test the relative resistance to corrosion of aluminium alloys when exposed to a changing climate of acetic acid salt spray, followed by air drying, followed by high humidity, all at an elevated temperature. This test is also referred to as a MASTMAASIS test. Test specimens are placed in an enclosed chamber, and exposed to a changing climate that comprises the following 3 part repeating cycle. 0.75 hours exposure to a continuous indirect spray of salt water solution, prepared in accordance with the requirements of the test standard and acidified (pH 2.8–3.0) by the addition of acetic acid. This spray is set to fall-out on to the specimens at a rate of 1–2 ml/80 cm^{2}/hour. This is followed by a 2 hour exposure to an air drying (purge) climate. This is followed by 3.25 hours exposure to a high humidity climate which gradually rises to between 65% RH and 95% RH. The entire test cycle is at a constant chamber temperature of 49 °C. The number of cycle repeats and therefore the test duration is variable.

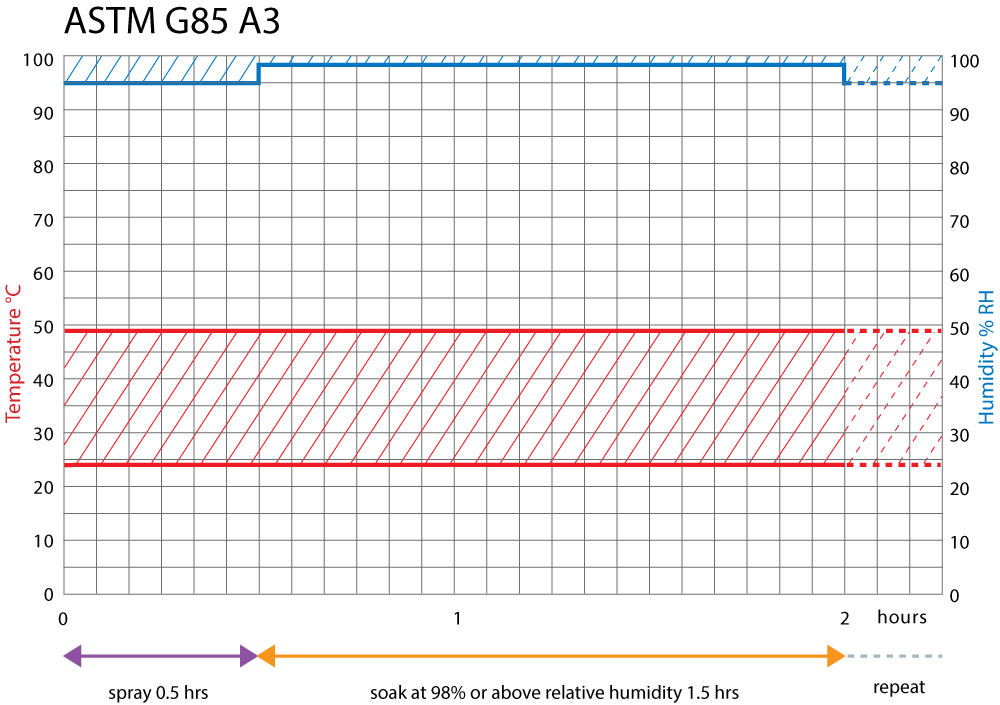
Graph showing the temperature & humidity steps required during modified Salt Spray Test ASTM G85 Annex 3

ASTM G85 Annex A3 – Seawater Acidified Test (cyclic)

This test can be used to test the relative resistance to corrosion of coated or uncoated aluminium alloys and other metals, when exposed to a changing climate of acidified synthetic seawater spray, followed by a high humidity, both at an elevated temperature. This test is also referred to as a SWAAT test. Test specimens are placed in an enclosed chamber, and exposed to a changing climate that comprises the following 2 part repeating cycle. First, a 30 minute exposure to a continuous indirect spray of synthetic seawater solution, prepared in accordance with the requirements of the test standard and acidified (pH 2.8–3.0) by the addition of acetic acid. This spray is set to fall-out on to the specimens at a rate of 1–2 ml/80 cm^{2}/hour. This is followed by a 90 minute exposure to a high humidity climate (above 98% RH). The entire test cycle is at a constant chamber temperature of 49 °C (may be reduced to 24–35 °C for organically coated specimens). The number of cycle repeats and therefore the test duration is variable.

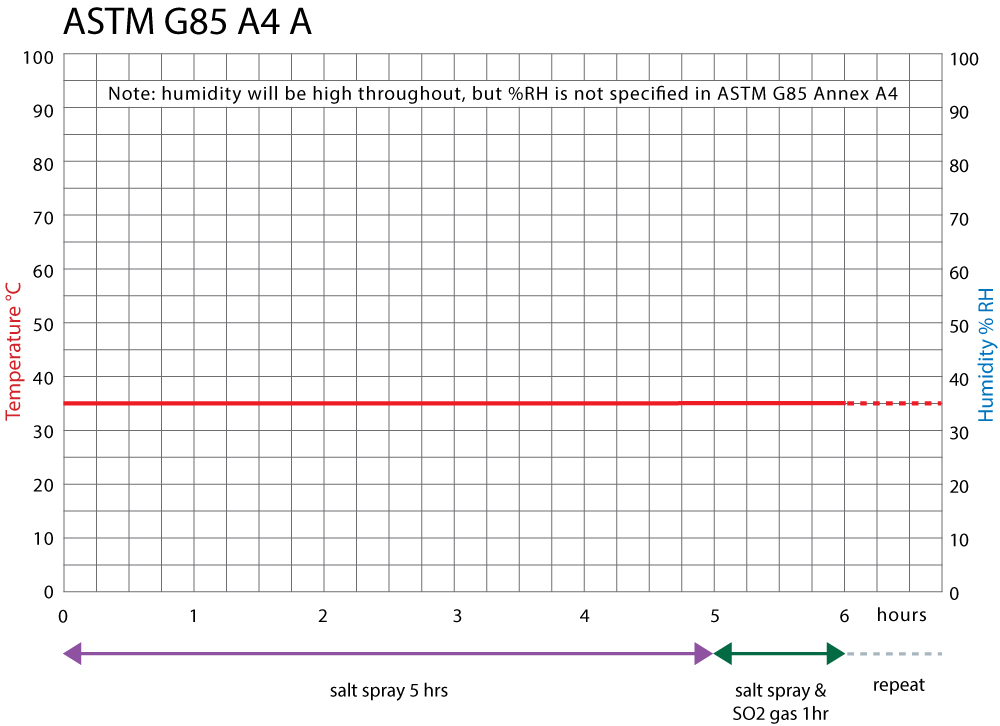
Graph showing the temperature & humidity steps required during modified Salt Spray Test ASTM G85 Annex 4A

ASTM G85 Annex A4 – SO_{2} Salt Spray Test (cyclic)

This test can be used to test the relative resistance to corrosion of product samples that are likely to encounter a combined SO_{2}/salt spray/acid rain environment during their usual service life. Test specimens are placed in an enclosed chamber, and exposed to 1 of 2 possible changing climate cycles. In either case, the exposure to salt spray may be salt water spray or synthetic sea water prepared in accordance with the requirements of the test standard. The most appropriate test cycle and spray solutions are to be agreed between parties.

The first climate cycle comprises a continuous indirect spray of neutral (pH 6.5–7.2) salt water/synthetic seawater solution, which falls-out on to the specimens at a rate of 1–2 ml/80 cm^{2}/hour. During this spraying, the chamber is dosed with SO_{2} gas at a rate of 35 cm^{3}/minute/m^{3} of chamber volume, for 1 hour in every 6 hours of spraying. The entire test cycle is at a constant chamber temperature of 35 °C. The number of cycle repeats and therefore the test duration is variable.

The second climate cycle comprises 0.5 hours of continuous indirect spray of neutral (pH 6.5–7.2) salt water/synthetic seawater solution, which falls-out on to the specimens at a rate of 1–2 ml/80 cm^{2}/hour. This is followed by 0.5 hours of dosing with SO_{2} gas at a rate of 35 cm^{3}/minute/m^{3} of chamber volume. This is followed by 2 hours of high humidity soak. The entire test cycle is at a constant chamber temperature of 35 °C. The number of cycle repeats and therefore the test duration is variable.

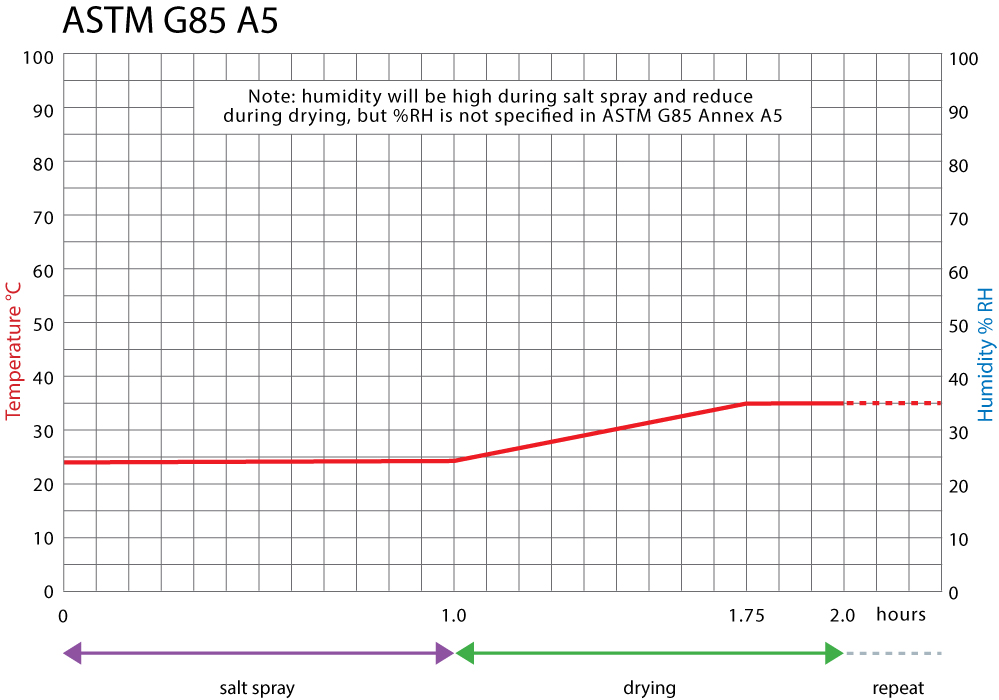
Graph showing the temperature & humidity steps required during modified Salt Spray Test ASTM G85 Annex 5

ASTM G85 Annex A5 – Dilute Electrolyte Salt Fog/Dry Test (cyclic)

This test can be used to test the relative resistance to corrosion of paints on steel when exposed to a changing climate of dilute salt spray at ambient temperature, followed by air drying at elevated temperature. It is a popular test in the surface coatings industry, where it is also referred to as the PROHESION test. Test specimens are placed in an enclosed chamber, and exposed to a changing climate with the following 2-part cycle. First, a 1-hour exposure to a continuous indirect spray of salt water solution, prepared in accordance with the requirements of the test standard and acidified (pH 3.1–3.3) by the addition of acetic acid. This spray is set to fall on the specimens at a rate of 1–2 ml/80 cm^{2}/hour, in an ambient chamber temperature (21–27 °C). This is followed by a 1-hour exposure to an air drying (purge) climate at 35 °C. The cycle repeats until the desired duration has been achieved.

== Standardization ==
Electroplated and yellow chromated bolt with white corrosion

Zinc flake coated bolt with red rust after testing

Chamber construction, testing procedure and testing parameters are standardized under national and international standards, such as ASTM B 117 and ISO 9227. These standards describe the necessary information to carry out this test; testing parameters such as temperature, air pressure of the sprayed solution, preparation of the spraying solution, concentration, pH, etc. Daily checking of testing parameters is necessary to show compliance with the standards, so records shall be maintained accordingly. ASTM B117 and ISO 9227 are widely used as reference standards. Testing cabinets are manufactured according to the specified requirements here.

However, these testing standards neither provide information of testing periods for the coatings to be evaluated, nor the appearance of corrosion products in form of salts. Requirements are agreed between customer and manufacturer. In the automotive industry requirements are specified under material specifications. Different coatings have different behavior in salt spray test and consequently, test duration will differ from one type of coating to another. For example, a typical electroplated zinc and yellow passivated steel part lasts 96 hours in salt spray test without white rust. Electroplated zinc-nickel steel parts can last more than 720 hours in NSS test without red rust (or 48 hours in CASS test without red rust) Requirements are established in test duration (hours) and coatings shall comply with minimum testing periods.

Artificial seawater which is sometimes used for Salt Spray Testing can be found at ASTM International. The standard for Artificial Seawater is ASTM D1141-98 which is the standard practice for the preparation of substitute ocean water.

== Uses ==
Typical coatings that can be evaluated with this method are:

- Phosphated (pre-treated) surfaces (with subsequent paint/primer/lacquer/rust preventive)
- Zinc and zinc-alloy plating (see also electroplating). See ISO 4042 for guidance
- Electroplated chromium, nickel, copper, tin
- Coatings not applied electrolytically, such as zinc flake coatings according to ISO 10683
- Organic coatings, such as rust preventives
- Paint Coating

Hot-dip galvanized surfaces are not generally tested in a salt spray test (see ISO 1461 or ISO 10684). Hot-dip galvanizing produces zinc carbonates when exposed to the natural environment's wet and dry cycles, this eventually results in the formation of a zinc patina. The zinc carbonate patina is not produced when a hot-dip galvanized specimen is exposed to a salt spray testing due to the lack, or limited exposure to dry cycles. Therefore this testing method does not give an accurate measurement of corrosion protection and is often considered unnecessary because real-world corrosion data for galvanized steel is readily available. ISO 9223 gives the guidelines for proper measurement of corrosion resistance for hot-dip galvanized specimens.

Painted surfaces with an underlying hot-dip galvanized coating can be tested according to this method. See ISO 12944-6.

Testing periods range from a few hours (e.g. 8 or 24 hours of phosphated steel) to more than a month (e.g. 720 hours of zinc-nickel coatings, 1000 hours of certain zinc flake coatings).

=== Bibliography ===
- Metal Finishing. Guidebook and directory issue. Published by Metal Finishing Magazine, 1996

== See also ==
- Corrosion
- Corrosion engineering
- Cyclic corrosion testing
- Environmental chamber
- Japanese Industrial Standards
- ASTM International
- International Organization for Standardization
