= Cyclic corrosion testing =

Acceleration of real-world corrosion failures

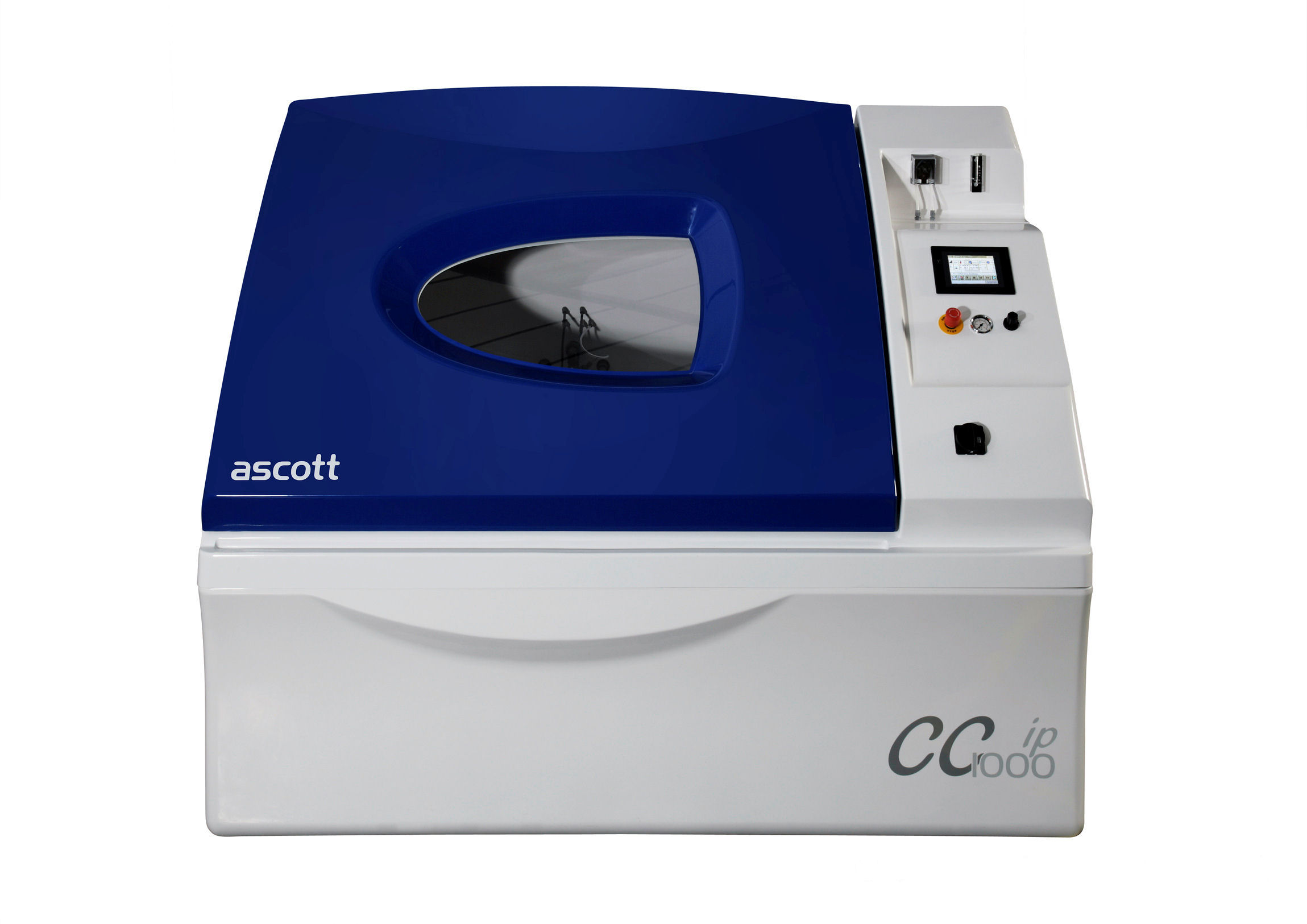
Example of a Cyclic corrosion test chamber.

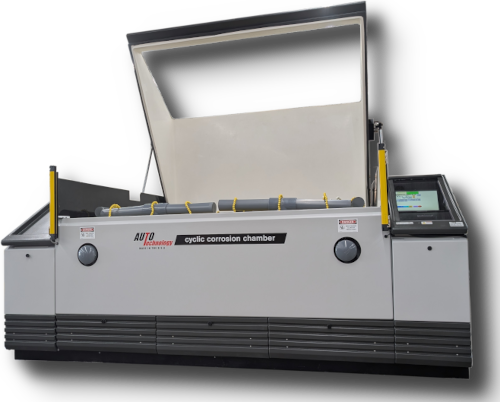
An Auto Technology Company NC-110 X Series cyclic corrosion test chamber, designed to perform accelerated corrosion testing.

Cyclic Corrosion Testing (CCT) has evolved in recent years, largely within the automotive industry, as a way of accelerating real-world corrosion failures, under laboratory controlled conditions. As the name implies, the test comprises different climates which are cycled automatically so the samples under test undergo the same sort of changing environment that would be encountered in the natural world. The intention being to bring about the type of failure that might occur naturally, but more quickly i.e. accelerated. By doing this manufacturers and suppliers can predict, more accurately, the service life expectancy of their products.

Until the development of Cyclic Corrosion Testing, the traditional Salt spray test was virtually all that manufacturers could use for this purpose. However, this test was never intended for this purpose. Because the test conditions specified for salt spray testing are not typical of a naturally occurring environment, this type of test cannot be used as a reliable means of predicting the ‘real world’ service life expectancy for the samples under test. The sole purpose of the salt spray test is to compare and contrast results with previous experience to perform a quality audit. So, for example, a spray test can be used to ‘police’ a production process and forewarn of potential manufacturing problems or defects, which might affect corrosion resistance.

To recreate these different environments within an environmental chamber requires much more flexible testing procedures than are available in a standard salt spray chamber.

The lack of correlation between results obtained from traditional salt spray testing and the ‘real world’ atmospheric corrosion of vehicles, left the automotive industry without a reliable test method for predicting the service life expectancy of their products. This was and remains of particular concern in an industry where anti-corrosion warranties have been gradually increasing and now run to several years for new vehicles.

With ever increasing consumer pressure for improved vehicle corrosion resistance and a few ‘high profile’ corrosion failures amongst some vehicle manufactures – with disastrous commercial consequences, the automotive industry recognized the need for a different type of corrosion test.

Such a test would need to simulate the types of conditions a vehicle might encounter naturally, but recreate and accelerate these conditions, with good repeatability, within the convenience of the laboratory. CCT is effective for evaluating a variety of corrosion types, including galvanic corrosion and crevice corrosion. One of the earliest introduced cyclic testing machines was the Prohesion cabinet.

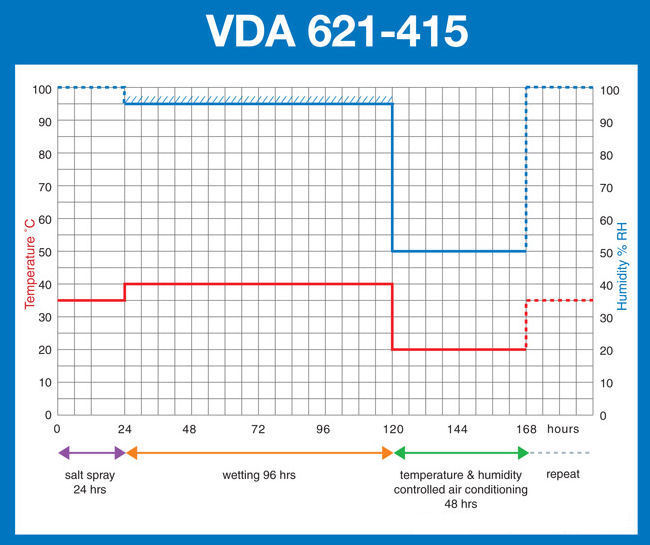
Graph showing the temperature & humidity steps required during cyclic corrosion test VDA 621-415

== Test Stages ==
Taking results gathered largely from ‘real world’ exposure sites, automotive companies, led originally by the Japanese automobile industry, developed their own Cyclic Corrosion Tests. These have evolved in different ways for different vehicle manufacturers, and such tests still remain largely industry specific, with no truly international CCT standard. However, they all generally require most of the following conditions to be created, in a repeating sequence or ‘cycle’, though not necessarily in the following order:

• A salt spray ‘pollution’ phase. This may be similar to the traditional salt spray test although in some cases direct impingement by the salt solution on the test specimens, or even complete immersion in salt water, is required. However, this ‘pollution’ phase is generally shorter in duration than a traditional salt spray test.

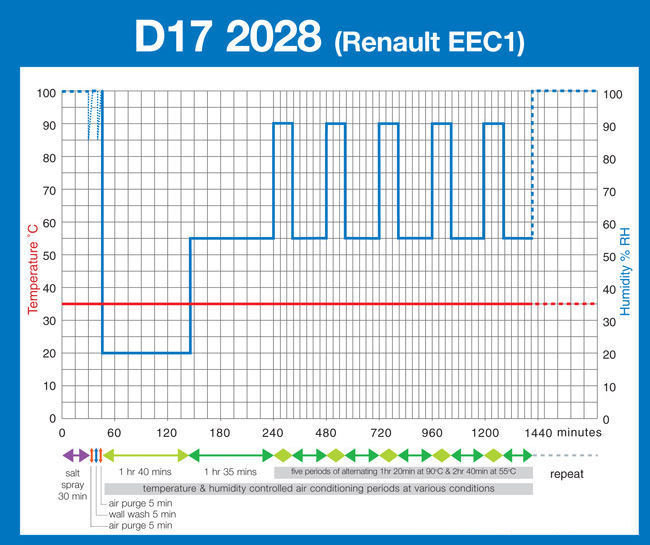
Graph showing the temperature & humidity steps required during cyclic corrosion test D17 2028 ECC1

• An air drying phase. Depending on the test, this may be conducted at ambient temperature, or at an elevated temperature, with or without control over the relative humidity and usually by introducing a continuous supply of relatively fresh air around the test samples at the same time. It is generally required that the samples under test should be visibly ‘dry’ at the end of this test phase.

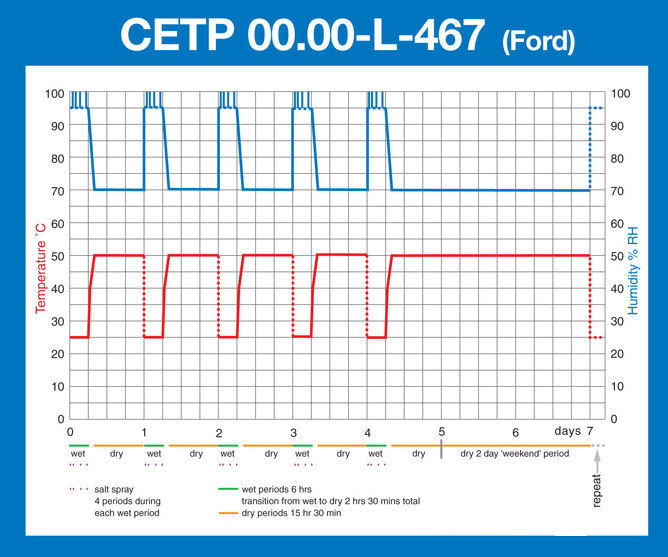
Graph showing the temperature & humidity steps required during cyclic corrosion test CETP 00.00-L-467

• A condensation humidity ‘wetting’ phase. This is usually conducted at an elevated temperature and generally a high humidity of 95-100%RH. The purpose of this phase is to promote the formation of condensation on the surfaces of the samples under test.

• A controlled humidity/humidity cycling phase. This requires the tests samples to be exposed to a controlled temperature and controlled humidity climate, which can either be constant or cycling between different levels. When cycling between different levels, the rate of change may also be specified.

The above list is not exhaustive, since some automotive companies may also require other climates to be created in sequence as well, for example; sub-zero refrigeration, but it does list the most common requirements.

== Tests Standards ==
The below list is not exhaustive, but here are some examples of popular cyclic corrosion test standards,

- ACT 1 (Volvo)
- ACT 2 (Volvo)
- CETP 00.00-L-467 (Ford)
- D17 2028 (Renault)
- JASO M 609
- SAE J 2334
- VDA 621-415

== See also ==
- Environmental chamber
- Salt spray test
- List of ASTM standards
- List of ISO standards
- List of DIN standards
- Society of Automotive Engineers
- Accelerated aging
- Failure causes
