= Quantum dot single-photon source =

Laser technology

A quantum dot single-photon source is based on a single quantum dot placed in an optical cavity. It is an on-demand single-photon source. A laser pulse can excite a pair of carriers known as an exciton in the quantum dot. The decay of a single exciton due to spontaneous emission leads to the emission of a single photon. Due to interactions between excitons, the emission when the quantum dot contains a single exciton is energetically distinct from that when the quantum dot contains more than one exciton. Therefore, a single exciton can be deterministically created by a laser pulse and the quantum dot becomes a nonclassical light source that emits photons one by one and thus shows photon antibunching. The emission of single photons can be proven by measuring the second order intensity correlation function. The spontaneous emission rate of the emitted photons can be enhanced by integrating the quantum dot in an optical cavity. Additionally, the cavity leads to emission in a well-defined optical mode increasing the efficiency of the photon source.

== History ==
With the growing interest in quantum information science since the beginning of the 21st century, research in different kinds of single-photon sources was growing. Early single-photon sources such as heralded photon sources that were first reported in 1985 are based on non-deterministic processes. Quantum dot single-photon sources are on-demand. A single-photon source based on a quantum dot in a microdisk structure was reported in 2000. Sources were subsequently embedded in different structures such as photonic crystals or micropillars. Adding distributed bragg reflectors (DBRs) allowed emission in a well-defined direction and increased emission efficiency. Most quantum dot single-photon sources need to work at cryogenic temperatures, which is still a technical challenge. The other challenge is to realize high-quality quantum dot single-photon sources at telecom wavelength for fiber telecommunication application. The first report on Purcell-enhanced single-photon emission of a telecom-wavelength quantum dot in a two-dimensional photonic crystal cavity with a quality factor of 2,000 shows the enhancements of the emission rate and the intensity by five and six folds, respectively.

== Theory of realizing a single-photon source ==
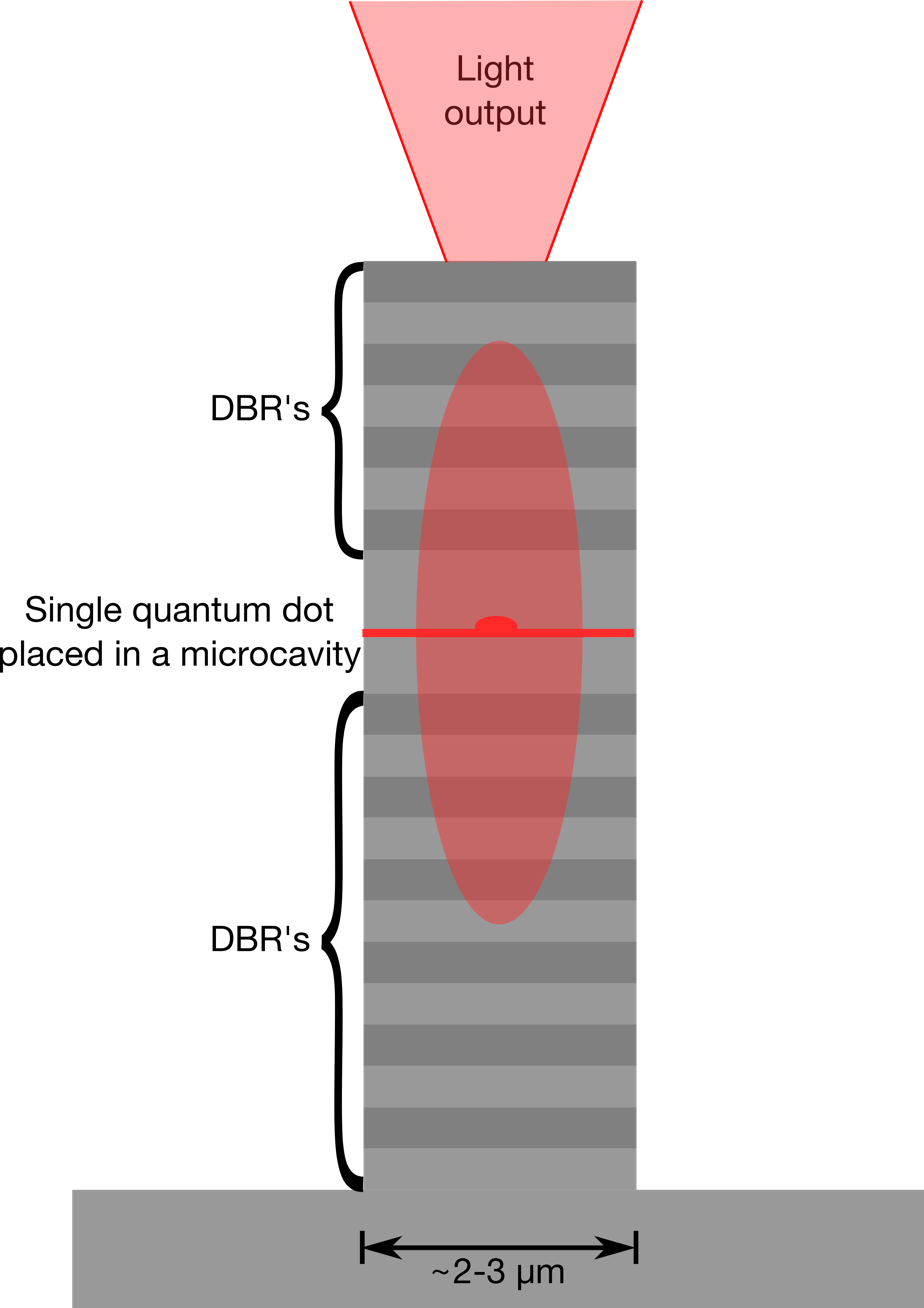
Figure 1: Schematic structure of an optical microcavity with a single quantum dot placed between two layers of DBR's. This structure works as a single photon source.

Exciting an electron in a semiconductor from the valence band to the conduction band creates an excited state, a so-called exciton. The spontaneous radiative decay of this exciton results in the emission of a photon. Since a quantum dot has discrete energy levels, it can be achieved that there is never more than one exciton in the quantum dot simultaneously. Therefore, the quantum dot is an emitter of single photons. A key challenge in making a good single-photon source is to make sure that the emission from the quantum dot is collected efficiently. To do that, the quantum dot is placed in an optical cavity. The cavity can, for instance, consist of two DBRs in a micropillar (Fig. 1). The cavity enhances the spontaneous emission in a well-defined optical mode (Purcell effect), facilitating efficient guiding of the emission into an optical fiber. Furthermore, the reduced exciton lifetime $\Delta t$ (see Fig. 2) reduces the significance of linewidth broadening due to noise.

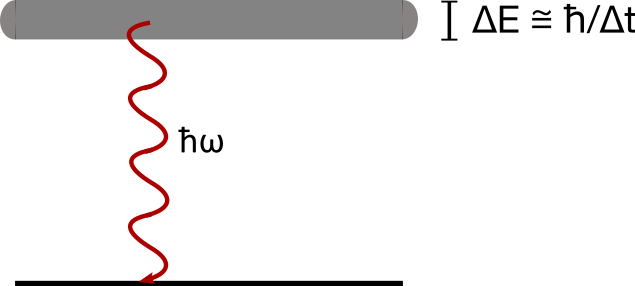
Figure 2: The decay of a linewidth broadened excited state results in the emission of a photon of frequency ħω. The linewidth broadening is a result of the finite lifetime of the excited state.

The system can then be approximated by the Jaynes-Cummings model. In this model, the quantum dot only interacts with one single mode of the optical cavity. The frequency of the optical mode is well defined. This makes the photons indistinguishable if their polarization is aligned by a polarizer. The solution of the Jaynes-Cummings Hamiltonian is a vacuum Rabi oscillation. A vacuum Rabi oscillation of a photon interacting with an exciton is known as an exciton-polariton.

To eliminate the probability of the simultaneous emission of two photons it has to be made sure that there can only be one exciton in the cavity at one time. The discrete energy states in a quantum dot allow only one excitation. Additionally, the Rydberg blockade prevents the excitation of two excitons at the same space... The electromagnetic interaction with the already existing exciton changes the energy for creating another exciton at the same space slightly. If the energy of the pump laser is tuned on resonance, the second exciton cannot be created. Still, there is a small probability of having two excitations in the quantum dot at the same time. Two excitons confined in a small volume are called biexcitons. They interact with each other and thus slightly change their energy. Photons resulting from the decay of biexcitons have a different energy than photons resulting from the decay of excitons. They can be filtered out by letting the outgoing beam pass an optical filter. The quantum dots can be excited both electrically and optically. For optical pumping, a pulsed laser can be used for excitation of the quantum dots. In order to have the highest probability of creating an exciton, the pump laser is tuned on resonance. This resembles a $\pi$-pulse on the Bloch sphere. However, this way the emitted photons have the same frequency as the pump laser. A polarizer is needed to distinguish between them. As the direction of polarization of the photons from the cavity is random, half of the emitted photons are blocked by this filter.

== Experimental realization ==
There are several ways to realize a quantum dot-cavity system that can act as a single-photon source. Typical cavity structures are micro-pillars, photonic crystal cavities, or tunable micro-cavities. Inside the cavity, different types of quantum dots can be used. The most widely used type are self-assembled InAs quantum dots grown in the Stranski-Krastanov growth mode, but other materials and growth methods such as local droplet etching have been used. A list of different experimental realizations is shown below:

- Micropillars: In this approach, quantum dots are grown between two distributed bragg reflectors (DBR mirrors). The DBRs are typically both grown by molecular beam epitaxy (MBE). For the mirrors two materials with different indices of refraction are grown in alternate order. Their lattice parameters should match to prevent strain. A possible combination is a combination of aluminum arsenide and gallium arsenide-layers. After the first DBR, material with smaller band gap is used to grow the quantum dot above the first DBR. The second layer of DBRs can now be grown on top of the layer with the quantum dots. The diameter of the pillar is only a few microns wide. To prevent the optical mode from exiting the cavity the micropillar must act as a waveguide. Semiconductors usually have relatively high indices of refraction about n≅3. Therefore, their extraction cone is small. On a smooth surface the micropillar works as an almost perfect waveguide. However losses increase with roughness of the walls and decreasing diameter of the micropillar. The edges thus must be as smooth as possible to minimize losses. This can be achieved by structuring the sample with Electron beam lithography and processing the pillars with reactive ion etching.
- Tunable micro-cavities hosting quantum dots can be also used as single-photon source. Different compared to micro-pillars, only a single DBR is grown below the quantum dots. The second part of the cavity is a curved top mirror that is physically detached from the semiconductor. The top-mirror can be moved with respect to the quantum dot position which allows tuning the cavity quantum dot coupling as needed. A further advantage over micro-pillars is that the charge-environment of the quantum dots can be stabilized by using diode structures. A disadvantage of the micro-cavity system is that it requires additional mechanical components to tune the cavity which increases the overall system size.
- Microlens and solid immersion lens: To increase the brightness of a quantum dot single-photon source, also microlens structures have been used. The concept is to reduce losses due to total internal reflection similar to what can be achieved with a solid immersion lens.
- Other single-photon sources are nanobeam or photonic crystal waveguides that contain quantum dots. For such structures, no DBRs are needed but can be used to improve the outcoupling efficiency. Compared to micropillars, this architecture has the advantage that on-chip routing of photons is possible. On the other side, the structure sizes are much smaller requiring more advanced nano-fabrication techniques. The close proximity of quantum dots to the surface is a further challenge.

=== Verification of emission of single photons ===
Single photon sources exhibit antibunching. As photons are emitted one at a time, the probability of seeing two photons at the same time for an ideal source is 0. To verify the antibunching of a light source, one can measure the autocorrelation function $g^{(2)}(\tau)$. A photon source is antibunched if $g^{(2)}(0)$ ≤ $g^{(2)}(\tau)$. For an ideal single photon source, $g^{(2)}(0)=0$. Experimentally, $g^{(2)}(\tau)$ is measured using the Hanbury Brown and Twiss effect. Using resonant excitation schemes, experimental values for $g^{(2)}(0)$ are typically in the regime of just a few percent. Values down to $g^{(2)}(0)=7.5 \times 10^{-5}$ have been reached without resonant excitation.

=== Indistinguishability of the emitted photons ===
For applications the photons emitted by a single photon source must be indistinguishable. The theoretical solution of the Jaynes-Cummings Hamiltonian is a well-defined mode in which only the polarization is random. After aligning the polarization of the photons, their indistinguishability can be measured. For that, the Hong-Ou-Mandel effect is used. Two photons of the source are prepared so that they enter a 50:50 beam splitter at the same time from the two different input channels. A detector is placed on both exits of the beam splitter. Coincidences between the two detectors are measured. If the photons are indistinguishable, no coincidences should occur. Experimentally, almost perfect indistinguishability is found.

== Applications ==
Single-photon sources are of great importance in quantum communication science. They can be used for truly random number generators. Single photons entering a beam splitter exhibit inherent quantum indeterminacy. Random numbers are used extensively in simulations using the Monte Carlo method.

Furthermore, single photon sources are essential in quantum cryptography. The BB84 scheme is a provable secure quantum key distribution scheme. It works with a light source that perfectly emits only one photon at a time. Due to the no-cloning theorem, no eavesdropping can happen without being noticed. The use of quantum randomness while writing the key prevents any patterns in the key that can be used to decipher the code.

Apart from that, single photon sources can be used to test some fundamental properties of quantum field theory.

== See also ==
- Optical microcavity
- Quantum dot
- Single-photon source
