= Lateral quantum dot =

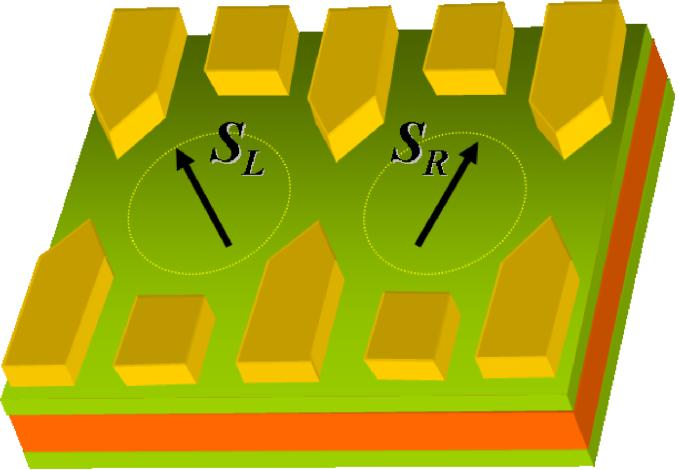
A double lateral quantum dot system. Electrons or holes are confined in the orange region using the electrostatic gates (yellow).

A lateral quantum dot is a type of quantum dot made by imposing a small area of decreased potential in the two-dimensional electron gas (2DEG) by means of electrical gates such that electrons or electron holes are confined in the 2DEG plane. The particles are confined in one dimension laterally where they are free to move in the plane of the 2DEG. Once the potential is applied, it is energetically favorable for a certain number of electrons (or holes) to remain confined in a certain area of the 2DEG causing the remaining two-dimensional freedom to be removed and the three dimensional confinement of the electrons or holes. The 2DEG is confined between two semiconductor sheets such as InAs and GaAs. The fabrication process for a lateral dot is very different from that for a self-assembled quantum dot.
