= Quantum dot =

Nano-scale semiconductor particles

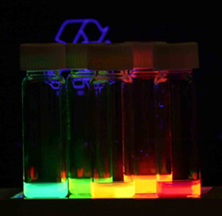
Colloidal quantum dots irradiated with a UV light. Differently sized quantum dots emit different colors of light due to quantum confinement.

Quantum dots (QDs) or semiconductor nanocrystals are semiconductor particles a few nanometres in size with optical and electronic properties that differ from those of larger particles via quantum mechanical effects. They are a central topic in nanotechnology and materials science. When a quantum dot is illuminated by UV light, an electron in the quantum dot can be excited to a state of higher energy. In the case of a semiconducting quantum dot, this process corresponds to the transition of an electron from the valence band to the conduction band. The excited electron can drop back into the valence band releasing its energy as light. This light emission (photoluminescence) is illustrated in the figure on the right. The color of that light depends on the energy difference between the discrete energy levels of the quantum dot in the conduction band and the valence band.

In other words, a quantum dot can be defined as a structure on a semiconductor which is capable of confining electrons in three dimensions, enabling the ability to define discrete energy levels. The quantum dots are tiny crystals that can behave as individual atoms, and their properties can be manipulated.

Nanoscale materials with semiconductor properties tightly confine either electrons or electron holes. The confinement is similar to a three-dimensional particle in a box model. The quantum dot absorption and emission features correspond to transitions between discrete quantum mechanically allowed energy levels in the box that are reminiscent of atomic spectra. For these reasons, quantum dots are sometimes referred to as artificial atoms, emphasizing their bound and discrete electronic states, like naturally occurring atoms or molecules. It was shown that the electronic wave functions in quantum dots resemble the ones in real atoms.

Quantum dots have properties intermediate between bulk semiconductors and discrete atoms or molecules. Their optoelectronic properties change as a function of both size and shape. Larger QDs of 5–6 nm diameter emit longer wavelengths, with colors such as orange, or red. Smaller QDs (2–3 nm) emit shorter wavelengths, yielding colors like blue and green. The specific emission energy of a QD depends on its dimensions, band gap energy, effective excited electron mass, and effective excited hole mass.

Potential applications of quantum dots include single-electron transistors, solar cells, LEDs, lasers, single-photon sources, second-harmonic generation, quantum computing, cell biology research, microscopy, and medical imaging. Their small size allows for some QDs to be suspended in solution, which may lead to their use in inkjet printing, and spin coating. They have been used in Langmuir–Blodgett thin films. These processing techniques result in less expensive and less time-consuming methods of semiconductor fabrication.

== Core/shell and core/double-shell structures ==
Quantum dots are usually coated with organic capping ligands (typically with long hydrocarbon chains, such as oleic acid) to control growth, prevent aggregation, and to promote dispersion in solution. However, these organic coatings can lead to non-radiative recombination after photogeneration, meaning the generated charge carriers can be dissipated without photon emission (e.g. via phonons or trapping in defect states), which reduces fluorescent quantum yield, or the conversion efficiency of absorbed photons into emitted fluorescence. To combat this, a semiconductor layer can be grown surrounding the quantum dot core. Depending on the bandgaps of the core and shell materials, the fluorescent properties of the nanocrystals can be tuned. Furthermore, adjusting the thicknesses of each of the layers and overall size of the quantum dots can affect the photoluminescent emission wavelength — the quantum confinement effect tends to blueshift the emission spectra as the quantum dot decreases in size. There are 4 major categories of quantum dot heterostructures: type I, inverse type I, type II, and inverse type II.

Type I quantum dots are composed of a semiconductor core encapsulated in a second semiconductor material with a larger bandgap, which can passivate non-radiative recombination sites at the surface of the quantum dots and improve quantum yield. Inverse type I quantum dots have a semiconductor layer with a smaller bandgap which leads to delocalized charge carriers in the shell. For type II and inverse type II dots, either the conduction or valence band of the core is located within the bandgap of the shell, which can lead to spatial separation of charge carriers in the core and shell. For all of these core/shell systems, the deposition of the outer layer can lead to potential lattice mismatch, which can limit the ability to grow a thick shell without reducing photoluminescent performance.

One such reason for the decrease in performance can be attributed to the physical strain being put on the lattice. In a case where ZnSe/ZnS (type I) and ZnSe/CdS (type II) quantum dots were being compared, the diameter of the uncoated ZnSe core (obtained using TEM) was compared to the capped core diameter (calculated via effective mass approximation model) [lattice strain source] to better understand the effect of core-shell strain. Type I heterostructures were found to induce compressive strain and "squeeze" the core, while the type II heterostructures had the effect of stretching the core under tensile strain. Because the fluorescent properties of quantum dots are dictated by nanocrystal size, induced changes in core dimensions can lead to shifting of emission wavelength, further proving why an intermediate semiconductor layer is necessary to rectify lattice mismatch and improve quantum yield.

One such core/double-shell system is the CdSe/ZnSe/ZnS nanocrystal. In a study comparing CdSe/ZnS and CdSe/ZnSe nanocrystals, the former was found to have PL yield 84% of the latter's, due to a lattice mismatch. To study the double-shell system, after synthesis of the core CdSe nanocrystals, a layer of ZnSe was coated prior to the ZnS outer shell, leading to an improvement in fluorescent efficiency by 70%. Furthermore, the two additional layers were found to improve resistance of the nanocrystals against photo-oxidation, which can contribute to degradation of the emission spectra.

It is also standard for surface passivation techniques to be applied to these core/double-shell systems, as well. As mentioned above, oleic acid is one such organic capping ligand that is used to promote colloidal stability and control nanocrystal growth, and can even be used to initiate a second round of ligand exchange and surface functionalization. However, because of the detrimental effect organic ligands have on PL efficiency, further studies have been conducted to obtain all-inorganic quantum dots. In one such study, intensely luminescent all-inorganic nanocrystals (ILANs) were synthesized via a ligand exchange process which substituted metal salts for the oleic acid ligands, and were found to have comparable photoluminescent quantum yields to that of existing red- and green-emitting quantum dots.

== Production ==
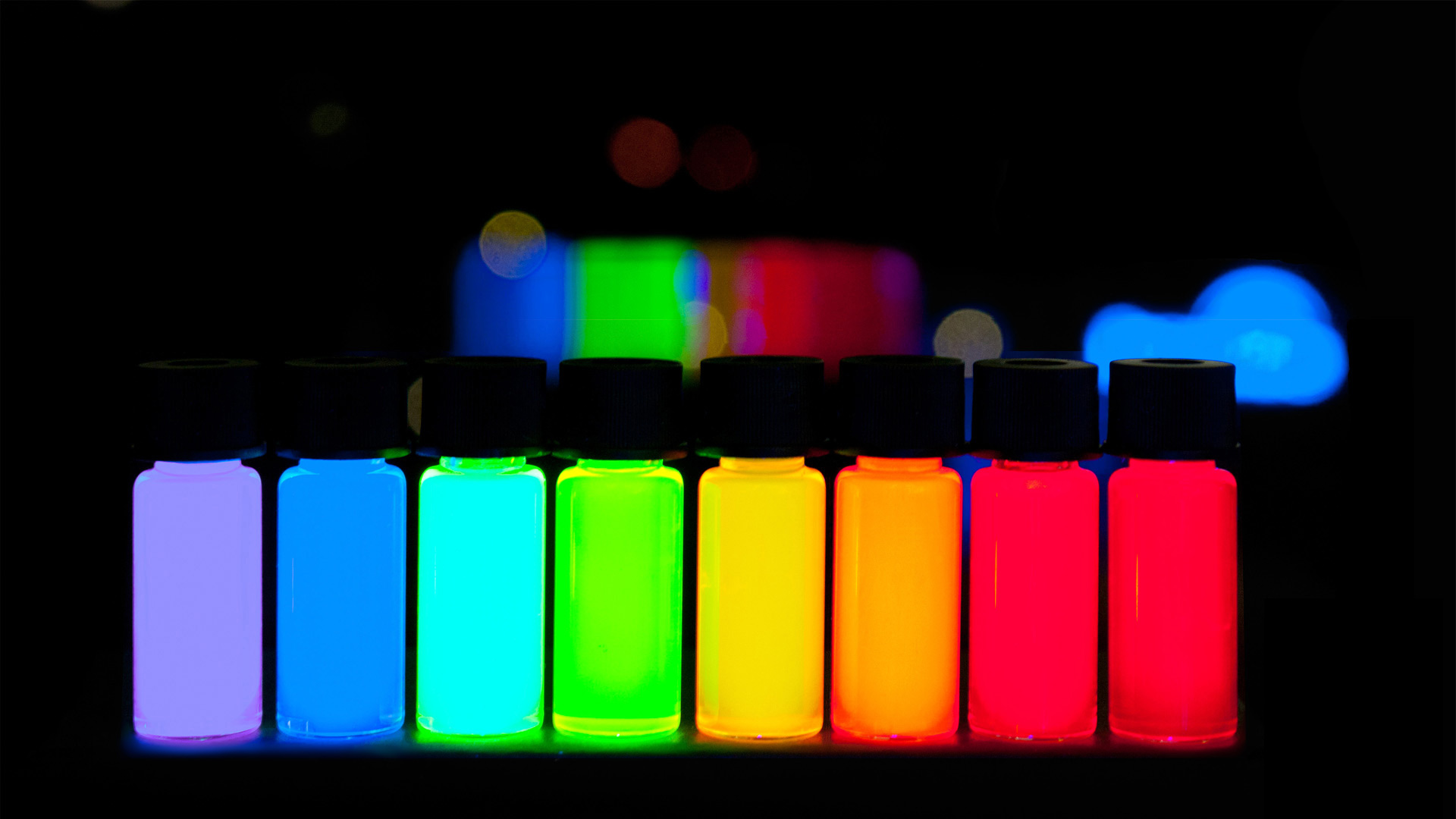
Quantum dots with gradually stepping emission from violet to deep red

There are several ways to fabricate quantum dots. Possible methods include colloidal synthesis, self-assembly, and electrical gating.

=== Colloidal synthesis ===
Colloidal semiconductor nanocrystals are synthesized from solutions, much like traditional chemical processes. The main difference is the product neither precipitates as a bulk solid nor remains dissolved. Heating the solution at high temperature, the precursors decompose forming monomers which then nucleate and generate nanocrystals. Temperature is a critical factor in determining optimal conditions for the nanocrystal growth. It must be high enough to allow for rearrangement and annealing of atoms during the synthesis process while being low enough to promote crystal growth. The concentration of monomers is another critical factor that has to be stringently controlled during nanocrystal growth. The growth process of nanocrystals can occur in two different regimes: "focusing" and "defocusing". At high monomer concentrations, the critical size (the size where nanocrystals neither grow nor shrink) is relatively small, resulting in growth of nearly all particles. In this regime, smaller particles grow faster than large ones (since larger crystals need more atoms to grow than small crystals) resulting in the size distribution focusing, yielding an improbable distribution of nearly monodispersed particles. The size focusing is optimal when the monomer concentration is kept such that the average nanocrystal size present is always slightly larger than the critical size. Over time, the monomer concentration diminishes, the critical size becomes larger than the average size present, and the distribution defocuses. There are colloidal methods to produce many different semiconductors. Typical dots are made of binary compounds such as lead sulfide, lead selenide, cadmium selenide, cadmium sulfide, cadmium telluride, indium arsenide, and indium phosphide. Dots may also be made from ternary compounds such as cadmium selenide sulfide. Further, recent advances have been made which allow for synthesis of colloidal perovskite quantum dots. These quantum dots can contain as few as 100 to 100,000 atoms within the quantum dot volume, with a diameter of approximately 10 to 50 atom diameters. This corresponds to about 2 to 10 nanometers, and at 10 nm in diameter, nearly 3 million quantum dots could be lined up end to end and fit within the width of a human thumb.

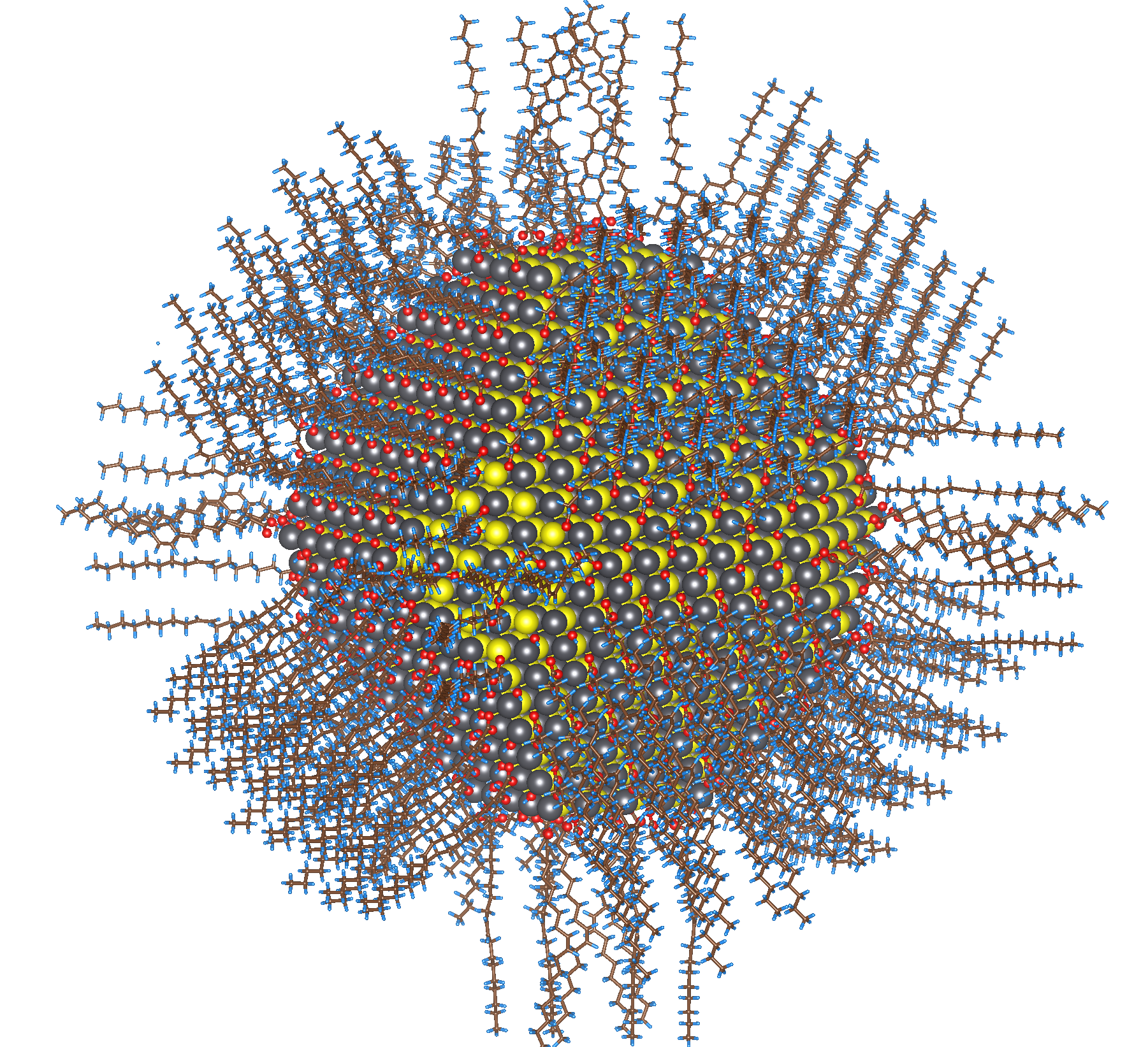
Idealized image of colloidal nanoparticle of lead sulfide (selenide) with complete passivation by oleic acid, oleyl amine, and hydroxyl ligands (size ≈5 nm)

Large batches of quantum dots may be synthesized via colloidal synthesis. Due to this scalability and the convenience of benchtop conditions, colloidal synthetic methods are promising for commercial applications.

=== Plasma synthesis ===
Plasma synthesis has evolved to be one of the most popular gas-phase approaches for the production of quantum dots, especially those with covalent bonds. For example, silicon and germanium quantum dots have been synthesized by using nonthermal plasma. The size, shape, surface and composition of quantum dots can all be controlled in nonthermal plasma. Doping that seems quite challenging for quantum dots has also been realized in plasma synthesis. Quantum dots synthesized by plasma are usually in the form of powder, for which surface modification may be carried out. This can lead to excellent dispersion of quantum dots in either organic solvents or water (i. e., colloidal quantum dots).

=== Fabrication ===
The electrostatic potential needed to create a quantum dot can be realized with several methods. These include external electrodes, doping, strain, or impurities. Self-assembled quantum dots are typically between 5 and 50 nm in size. Quantum dots defined by lithographically patterned gate electrodes, or by etching on two-dimensional electron gases in semiconductor heterostructures can have lateral dimensions between 20 and 100 nm.

The formation of quantum dots can be spontaneous when a semiconductor material is deposited on a substrate and a difference in lattice space exists between them.

By means of advanced nanofabrication technologies it is possible to manipulate properties of the quantum dots, such as their interactions, shape, size and transparency.

For example, when negative voltage is applied to a metal gate around a QD, as response, its diameter starts to be gradually squeezed, as a consequence, the number of electrons on the dot starts to decrease one by one, this could be made until there are no more left.

The previous property allows to record the current flow as the number of electrons on the dot, this implies that the energy variates.

- Some quantum dots are small regions of one material buried in another with a larger band gap. These can be so-called core–shell structures, for example, with CdSe in the core and ZnS in the shell, or from special forms of silica called ormosil. Sub-monolayer shells can also be effective ways of passivating the quantum dots, such as PbS cores with sub-monolayer CdS shells.
- Quantum dots sometimes occur spontaneously in quantum well structures due to monolayer fluctuations in the well's thickness.

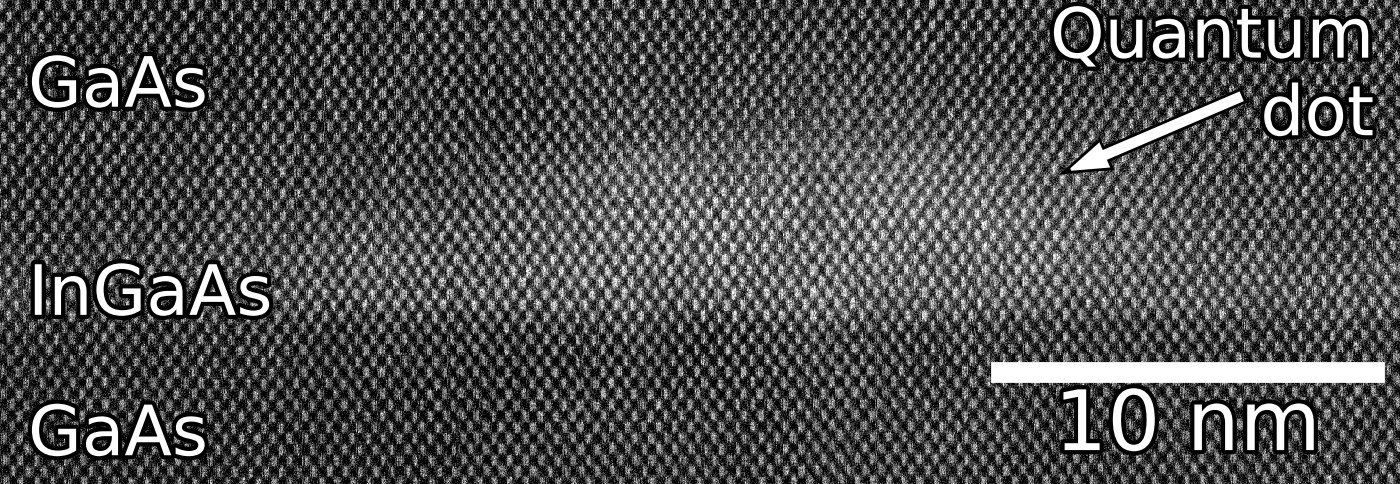
Atomic resolution scanning transmission electron microscopy image of an indium gallium arsenide (InGaAs) quantum dot buried in gallium arsenide (GaAs)

- Self-assembled quantum dots nucleate spontaneously under certain conditions during molecular-beam epitaxy (MBE) and metalorganic vapour-phase epitaxy (MOVPE), when a material is grown on a substrate to which it is not lattice matched. The resulting strain leads to the formation of islands on top of a two-dimensional wetting layer. This growth mode is known as Stranski–Krastanov growth. The islands can be subsequently buried to form the quantum dot. A widely used type of quantum dots grown with this method are indium gallium arsenide (InGaAs) quantum dots in gallium arsenide (GaAs). Such quantum dots have the potential for applications in quantum cryptography (that is, single-photon sources) and quantum computation. The main limitations of this method are the cost of fabrication and the lack of control over positioning of individual dots. Despite these limitations, self-assembled InAs quantum dots grown by this method have been extensively characterized optically. Cathodoluminescence spectroscopy of individual dots revealed ultranarrow luminescence lines below 0.15 meV, providing direct experimental evidence for the discrete, delta-function-like electronic density of states predicted for zero-dimensional structures.
- Individual quantum dots can be created from two-dimensional electron or hole gases present in remotely doped quantum wells or semiconductor heterostructures called lateral quantum dots. The sample surface is coated with a thin layer of resist and a lateral pattern is then defined in the resist by electron-beam lithography. This pattern can then be transferred to the electron or hole gas by etching, or by depositing metal electrodes (lift-off process) that allow the application of external voltages between the electron gas and the electrodes. Such quantum dots are mainly of interest for experiments and applications involving electron or hole transport and they are also used as spin qubits. A strength of this type of quantum dots is that their energy spectrum can be engineered by controlling the geometrical size, shape, and the strength of the confinement potential with gate electrodes. These quantum dots can be easily connected by tunnel barriers to conducting leads, which allows the application of the techniques of tunneling spectroscopy for their investigation.
- Complementary metal–oxide–semiconductor (CMOS) technology can be employed to fabricate silicon quantum dots. Ultra small (20 nm × 20 nm) CMOS transistors behave as single electron quantum dots when operated at cryogenic temperature over a range of −269 °C (4 K) to about −258 °C (15 K). The transistor displays Coulomb blockade due to progressive charging of electrons (holes) one by one. The number of electrons (holes) confined in the channel is driven by the gate voltage, starting from an occupation of zero electrons (holes), and it can be set to one or many.

=== Viral assembly ===
Genetically engineered M13 bacteriophage viruses allow preparation of quantum dot biocomposite structures. It had previously been shown that genetically engineered viruses can recognize specific semiconductor surfaces through the method of selection by combinatorial phage display. Additionally, it is known that liquid crystalline structures of wild-type viruses (Fd, M13, and TMV) are adjustable by controlling the solution concentrations, solution ionic strength, and the external magnetic field applied to the solutions. Consequently, the specific recognition properties of the virus can be used to organize inorganic nanocrystals, forming ordered arrays over the length scale defined by liquid crystal formation. Using this information, Lee et al. (2000) were able to create self-assembled, highly oriented, self-supporting films from a phage and ZnS precursor solution. This system allowed them to vary both the length of bacteriophage and the type of inorganic material through genetic modification and selection.

=== Electrochemical assembly ===
Highly ordered arrays of quantum dots may also be self-assembled by electrochemical techniques. A template is created by causing an ionic reaction at an electrolyte–metal interface which results in the spontaneous assembly of nanostructures, including quantum dots, onto the metal which is then used as a mask for mesa-etching these nanostructures on a chosen substrate.

=== Bulk manufacture ===
Quantum dot manufacturing relies on a process called high temperature dual injection which has been scaled by multiple companies for commercial applications that require large quantities (hundreds of kilograms to tons) of quantum dots. This reproducible production method can be applied to a wide range of quantum dot sizes and compositions.

The bonding in certain cadmium-free quantum dots, such as III–V-based quantum dots, is more covalent than that in II–VI materials, therefore it is more difficult to separate nanoparticle nucleation and growth via a high temperature dual injection synthesis. An alternative method of quantum dot synthesis, the molecular seeding process, provides a reproducible route to the production of high-quality quantum dots in large volumes. The process utilises identical molecules of a molecular cluster compound as the nucleation sites for nanoparticle growth, thus avoiding the need for a high temperature injection step. Particle growth is maintained by the periodic addition of precursors at moderate temperatures until the desired particle size is reached. The molecular seeding process is not limited to the production of cadmium-free quantum dots; for example, the process can be used to synthesise kilogram batches of high-quality II–VI quantum dots in just a few hours.

Another approach for the mass production of colloidal quantum dots can be seen in the transfer of the well-known hot-injection methodology for the synthesis to a technical continuous flow system. The batch-to-batch variations arising from the needs during the mentioned methodology can be overcome by utilizing technical components for mixing and growth as well as transport and temperature adjustments. For the production of CdSe based semiconductor nanoparticles this method has been investigated and tuned to production amounts of kilograms per month. Since the use of technical components allows for easy interchange in regards of maximum throughput and size, it can be further enhanced to tens or even hundreds of kilograms.

In 2011 a consortium of U.S. and Dutch companies reported a milestone in high-volume quantum dot manufacturing by applying the traditional high temperature dual injection method to a flow system.

On 23 January 2013 Dow entered into an exclusive licensing agreement with UK-based Nanoco for the use of their low-temperature molecular seeding method for bulk manufacture of cadmium-free quantum dots for electronic displays, and on 24 September 2014 Dow commenced work on the production facility in South Korea capable of producing sufficient quantum dots for "millions of cadmium-free televisions and other devices, such as tablets". Mass production was due to commence in mid-2015. On 24 March 2015, Dow announced a partnership deal with LG Electronics to develop the use of cadmium free quantum dots in displays.

== Health and safety ==
Some quantum dots pose risks to human health and the environment under certain conditions. Notably, the studies on quantum dot toxicity have focused on particles containing cadmium and have yet to be demonstrated in animal models after physiologically relevant dosing. In vitro studies, based on cell cultures, on quantum dots (QD) toxicity suggest that their toxicity may derive from multiple factors including their physicochemical characteristics (size, shape, composition, surface functional groups, and surface charges) and their environment. Assessing their potential toxicity is complex as these factors include properties such as QD size, charge, concentration, chemical composition, capping ligands, and also on their oxidative, mechanical, and photolytic stability.

Many studies have focused on the mechanism of QD cytotoxicity using model cell cultures. It has been demonstrated that after exposure to ultraviolet radiation or oxidation by air, CdSe QDs release free cadmium ions causing cell death. Group II–VI QDs also have been reported to induce the formation of reactive oxygen species after exposure to light, which in turn can damage cellular components such as proteins, lipids, and DNA. Some studies have also demonstrated that addition of a ZnS shell inhibits the process of reactive oxygen species in CdSe QDs. Another aspect of QD toxicity is that there are, in vivo, size-dependent intracellular pathways that concentrate these particles in cellular organelles that are inaccessible by metal ions, which may result in unique patterns of cytotoxicity compared to their constituent metal ions. The reports of QD localization in the cell nucleus present additional modes of toxicity because they may induce DNA mutation, which in turn will propagate through future generation of cells, causing diseases.

Although concentration of QDs in certain organelles have been reported in in vivo studies using animal models, no alterations in animal behavior, weight, hematological markers, or organ damage has been found through either histological or biochemical analysis. These findings have led scientists to believe that intracellular dose is the most important determining factor for QD toxicity. Therefore, factors determining the QD endocytosis that determine the effective intracellular concentration, such as QD size, shape, and surface chemistry determine their toxicity. Excretion of QDs through urine in animal models also have demonstrated via injecting radio-labeled ZnS-capped CdSe QDs where the ligand shell was labeled with ^{99m}Tc. Though multiple other studies have concluded retention of QDs in cellular levels, exocytosis of QDs is still poorly studied in the literature.

While significant research efforts have broadened the understanding of toxicity of QDs, there are large discrepancies in the literature, and questions still remain to be answered. Diversity of this class of material as compared to normal chemical substances makes the assessment of their toxicity very challenging. As their toxicity may also be dynamic depending on the environmental factors such as pH level, light exposure, and cell type, traditional methods of assessing toxicity of chemicals such as LD_{50} are not applicable for QDs. Therefore, researchers are focusing on introducing novel approaches and adapting existing methods to include this unique class of materials. Furthermore, novel strategies to engineer safer QDs are still under exploration by the scientific community. A recent novelty in the field is the discovery of carbon quantum dots, a new generation of optically active nanoparticles potentially capable of replacing semiconductor QDs, but with the advantage of much lower toxicity.

== Optical properties ==
Fluorescence spectra of CdTe quantum dots of various sizes. Different sized quantum dots emit different color light due to quantum confinement.

Quantum dots have been gaining interest from the scientific community because of their interesting optical properties, the main being band gap tunability. When an electron is excited to the conduction band, it leaves behind a vacancy in the valence band called hole. These two opposite charges are bound by Coulombic interactions in what is called an exciton and their spatial separation is defined by the exciton Bohr radius. In a nanostructure of comparable size to the exciton Bohr radius, the exciton is physically confined within the semiconductor resulting in an increase of the band gap of the material. This dependence can be predicted using the Brus model.

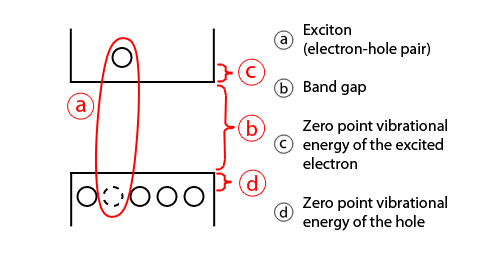

As the confinement energy depends on the quantum dot's size, both absorption onset and fluorescence emission can be tuned by changing the size of the quantum dot during its synthesis. The larger the dot, the redder (lower-energy) its absorption onset and fluorescence spectrum. Conversely, smaller dots absorb and emit bluer (higher-energy) light. Recent articles suggest that the shape of the quantum dot may be a factor in the coloration as well, but as yet not enough information is available. Furthermore, it was shown that the lifetime of fluorescence is determined by the size of the quantum dot. Larger dots have more closely spaced energy levels in which the electron–hole pair can be trapped. Therefore, electron–hole pairs in larger dots live longer causing larger dots to show a longer lifetime.

To improve fluorescence quantum yield, quantum dots can be made with shells of a larger bandgap semiconductor material around them. The improvement is suggested to be due to the reduced access of electron and hole to non-radiative surface recombination pathways in some cases, but also due to reduced Auger recombination in others.

== Applications ==
Quantum dots are particularly promising for optical applications due to their high extinction coefficient and ultrafast optical nonlinearities with potential applications for developing all-optical systems. They operate like a single-electron transistor and show the Coulomb blockade effect. Quantum dots have also been suggested as implementations of qubits for quantum information processing, and as active elements for thermoelectrics.

Tuning the size of quantum dots is attractive for many potential applications. For instance, larger quantum dots have a greater spectrum shift toward red compared to smaller dots and exhibit less pronounced quantum properties. Conversely, the smaller particles allow one to take advantage of more subtle quantum effects.

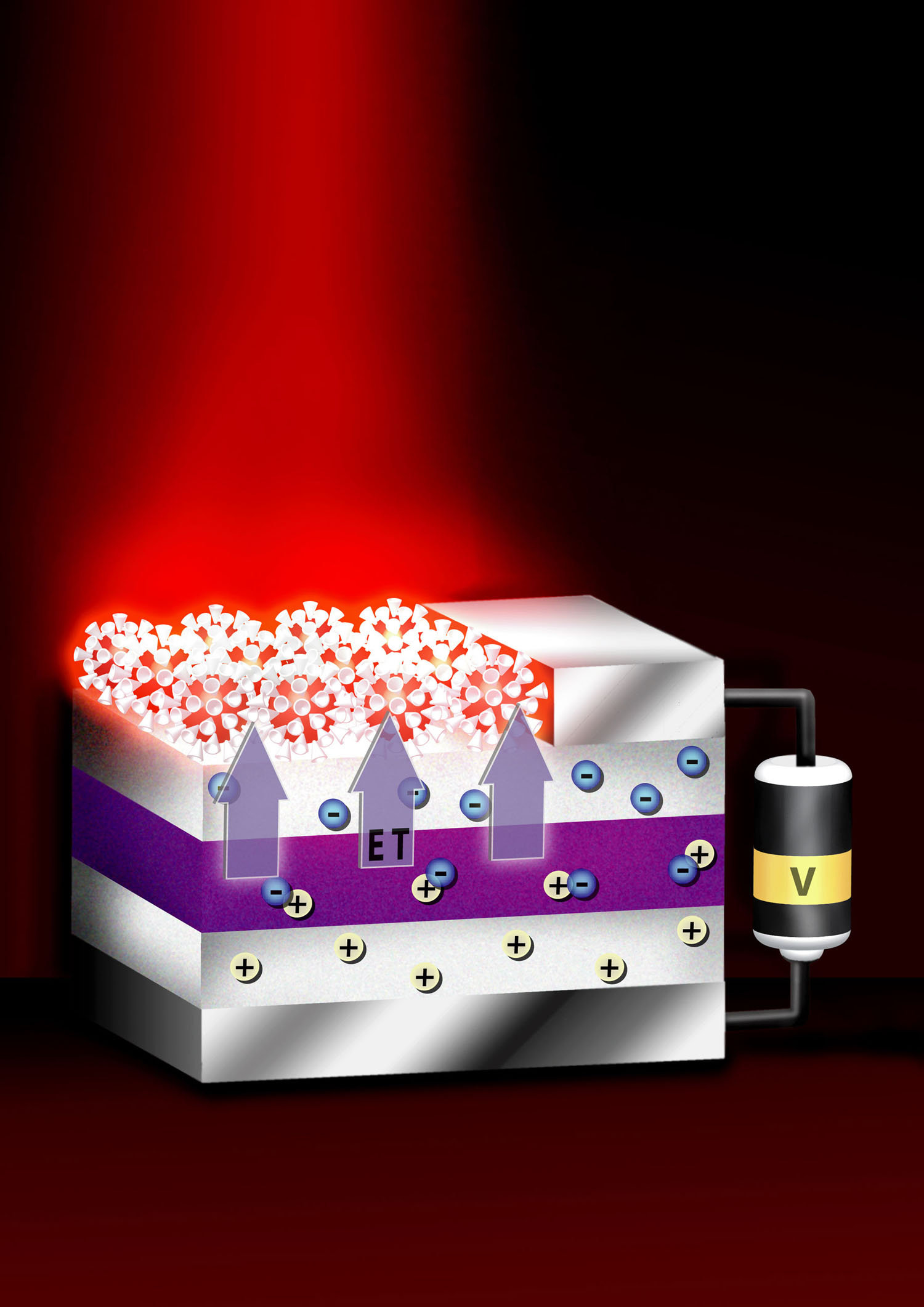
A device that produces visible light, through energy transfer from thin layers of quantum wells to crystals above the layers

Being zero-dimensional, quantum dots have a sharper density of states than higher-dimensional structures. As a result, they have superior transport and optical properties. They have potential uses in diode lasers, amplifiers, and biological sensors. Quantum dots may be excited within a locally enhanced electromagnetic field produced by gold nanoparticles, which then can be observed from the surface plasmon resonance in the photoluminescent excitation spectrum of (CdSe)ZnS nanocrystals. High-quality quantum dots are well suited for optical encoding and multiplexing applications due to their broad excitation profiles and narrow/symmetric emission spectra. The new generations of quantum dots have far-reaching potential for the study of intracellular processes at the single-molecule level, high-resolution cellular imaging, long-term in vivo observation of cell trafficking, tumor targeting, and diagnostics.

CdSe nanocrystals are efficient triplet photosensitizers. Laser excitation of small CdSe nanoparticles enables the extraction of the excited state energy from the quantum dots into bulk solution, thus opening the door to a wide range of potential applications such as photodynamic therapy, photovoltaic devices, molecular electronics, and catalysis.

=== Biology ===
In modern biological analysis, various kinds of organic dyes are used. However, as technology advances, greater flexibility in these dyes is sought. To this end, quantum dots have quickly filled in the role, being found to be superior to traditional organic dyes on several counts, one of the most immediately obvious being brightness (owing to the high extinction coefficient combined with a comparable quantum yield to fluorescent dyes) as well as their stability (allowing much less photobleaching). It has been estimated that quantum dots are 20 times brighter and 100 times more stable than traditional fluorescent reporters. For single-particle tracking, the irregular blinking of quantum dots is a minor drawback. However, there have been groups which have developed quantum dots which are essentially nonblinking and demonstrated their utility in single-molecule tracking experiments.

The use of quantum dots for highly sensitive cellular imaging has seen major advances. The improved photostability of quantum dots, for example, allows the acquisition of many consecutive focal-plane images that can be reconstructed into a high-resolution three-dimensional image. Another application that takes advantage of the extraordinary photostability of quantum dot probes is the real-time tracking of molecules and cells over extended periods of time. Antibodies, streptavidin, peptides, DNA, nucleic acid aptamers, or small-molecule ligands can be used to target quantum dots to specific proteins on cells. Researchers were able to observe quantum dots in lymph nodes of mice for more than 4 months.

Quantum dots can have antibacterial properties similar to nanoparticles and can kill bacteria in a dose-dependent manner. One mechanism by which quantum dots can kill bacteria is through impairing the functions of antioxidative system in the cells and down regulating the antioxidative genes. In addition, quantum dots can directly damage the cell wall. Quantum dots have been shown to be effective against both gram- positive and gram-negative bacteria.

Semiconductor quantum dots have also been employed for in vitro imaging of pre-labeled cells. The ability to image single-cell migration in real time is expected to be important to several research areas such as embryogenesis, cancer metastasis, stem cell therapeutics, and lymphocyte immunology.

One application of quantum dots in biology is as donor fluorophores in Förster resonance energy transfer, where the large extinction coefficient and spectral purity of these fluorophores make them superior to molecular fluorophores It is also worth noting that the broad absorbance of QDs allows selective excitation of the QD donor and a minimum excitation of a dye acceptor in FRET-based studies. The applicability of the FRET model, which assumes that the Quantum Dot can be approximated as a point dipole, has recently been demonstrated

The use of quantum dots for tumor targeting under in vivo conditions employ two targeting schemes: active targeting and passive targeting. In the case of active targeting, quantum dots are functionalized with tumor-specific binding sites to selectively bind to tumor cells. Passive targeting uses the enhanced permeation and retention of tumor cells for the delivery of quantum dot probes. Fast-growing tumor cells typically have more permeable membranes than healthy cells, allowing the leakage of small nanoparticles into the cell body. Moreover, tumor cells lack an effective lymphatic drainage system, which leads to subsequent nanoparticle accumulation.

Quantum dot probes exhibit in vivo toxicity. For example, CdSe nanocrystals are highly toxic to cultured cells under UV illumination, because the particles dissolve, in a process known as photolysis, to release toxic cadmium ions into the culture medium. In the absence of UV irradiation, however, quantum dots with a stable polymer coating have been found to be essentially nontoxic. Hydrogel encapsulation of quantum dots allows for quantum dots to be introduced into a stable aqueous solution, reducing the possibility of cadmium leakage. Then again, only little is known about the excretion process of quantum dots from living organisms.

In another potential application, quantum dots are being investigated as the inorganic fluorophore for intra-operative detection of tumors using fluorescence spectroscopy.

Delivery of undamaged quantum dots to the cell cytoplasm has been a challenge with existing techniques. Vector-based methods have resulted in aggregation and endosomal sequestration of quantum dots while electroporation can damage the semi-conducting particles and aggregate delivered dots in the cytosol. Via cell squeezing, quantum dots can be efficiently delivered without inducing aggregation, trapping material in endosomes, or significant loss of cell viability. Moreover, it has shown that individual quantum dots delivered by this approach are detectable in the cell cytosol, thus illustrating the potential of this technique for single-molecule tracking studies.

=== Photovoltaic devices ===
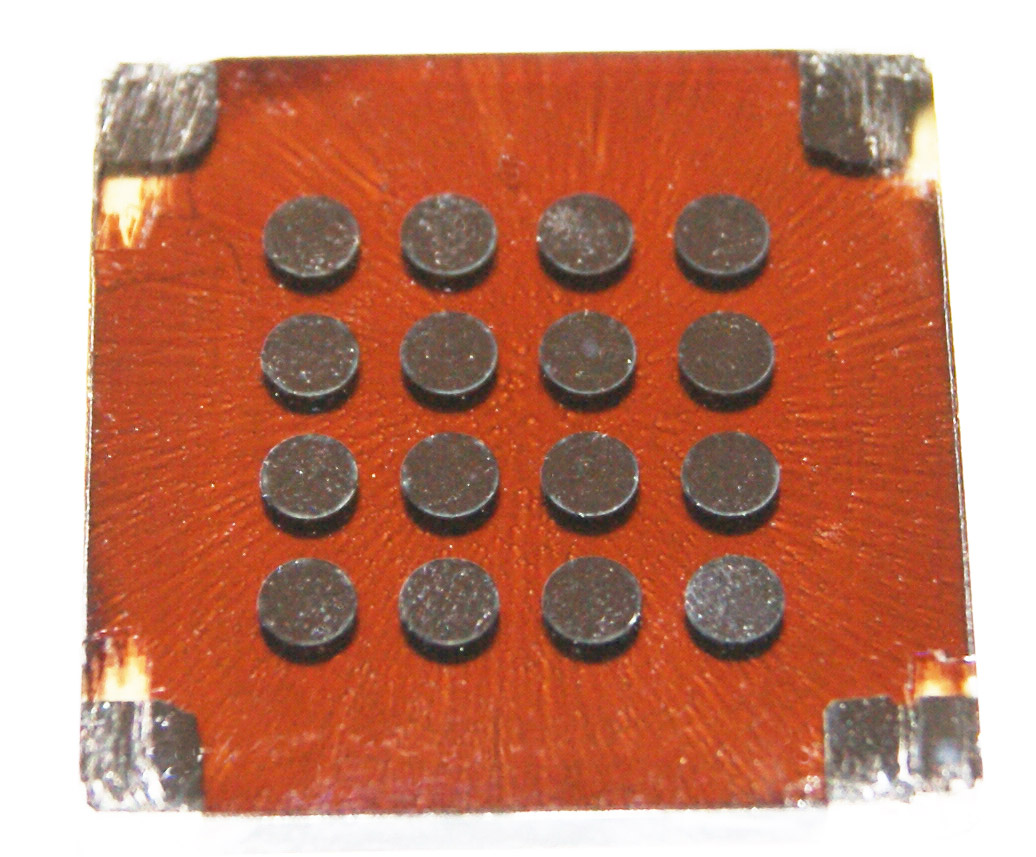
Spin-cast quantum dot solar cell built by the Sargent Group at the University of Toronto. The metal disks on the front surface are the electrical connections to the layers below.

The tunable absorption spectrum and high extinction coefficients of quantum dots make them attractive for light harvesting technologies such as photovoltaics. Quantum dots may be able to increase the efficiency and reduce the cost of today's typical silicon photovoltaic cells. According to an experimental report from 2004, quantum dots of lead selenide (PbSe) can produce more than one exciton from one high-energy photon via the process of carrier multiplication or multiple exciton generation (MEG). This compares favorably to today's photovoltaic cells which can only manage one exciton per high-energy photon, with high kinetic energy carriers losing their energy as heat. On the other hand, the quantum-confined ground-states of colloidal quantum dots (such as lead sulfide, PbS) incorporated in wider-bandgap host semiconductors (such as perovskite) can allow the generation of photocurrent from photons with energy below the host bandgap, via a two-photon absorption process, offering another approach (termed intermediate band, IB) to exploit a broader range of the solar spectrum and thereby achieve higher photovoltaic efficiency.

Colloidal quantum dot photovoltaics would theoretically be cheaper to manufacture, as they can be made using simple chemical reactions.

==== Quantum dot only solar cells ====
Aromatic self-assembled monolayers (SAMs) (such as 4-nitrobenzoic acid) can be used to improve the band alignment at electrodes for better efficiencies. This technique has provided a record power conversion efficiency (PCE) of 10.7%. The SAM is positioned between ZnO–PbS colloidal quantum dot (CQD) film junction to modify band alignment via the dipole moment of the constituent SAM molecule, and the band tuning may be modified via the density, dipole and the orientation of the SAM molecule.

==== Quantum dot in hybrid solar cells ====
Colloidal quantum dots are also used in inorganic–organic hybrid solar cells. These solar cells are attractive because of the potential for low-cost fabrication and relatively high efficiency. Incorporation of metal oxides, such as ZnO, TiO_{2}, and Nb_{2}O_{5} nanomaterials into organic photovoltaics have been commercialized using full roll-to-roll processing. A 13.2% power conversion efficiency is claimed in Si nanowire/PEDOT:PSS hybrid solar cells.

==== Quantum dot with nanowire in solar cells ====
Another potential use involves capped single-crystal ZnO nanowires with CdSe quantum dots, immersed in mercaptopropionic acid as hole transport medium in order to obtain a QD-sensitized solar cell. The morphology of the nanowires allowed the electrons to have a direct pathway to the photoanode. This form of solar cell exhibits 50–60% internal quantum efficiencies.

The use of silicon nanowires (SiNWs) with quantum dot coatings instead of planar silicon enhances the antiflection properties of Si. The SiNW exhibits a light-trapping effect which, in conjunction with carbon quantum dots, resulted in a solar cell that reached 9.10% PCE.

Graphene quantum dots have also been blended with organic electronic materials to improve efficiency and lower cost in photovoltaic devices and organic light emitting diodes (OLEDs) compared to graphene sheets. These graphene quantum dots were functionalized with organic ligands that experience photoluminescence from UV–visible absorption.

=== Quantum dot anodes for batteries ===
==== Improvement in batteries ====
Improvements can be seen in the electrical conductivity and charge retention of batteries when QDs are added to anodes.

In a comparison made between Pure MnO and MnO doped with quantum dot for the capacity of charge and discharge in (mAh/g) against the number of cycles, it can be seen that battery capacity, or the amount of energy that a battery can hold, is higher in MnO quantum dot-doped batteries than in batteries without, and remains higher after many charging/discharging cycles, taking in consideration a current density of Ag^-1. There exists a constant average difference of around 250 mAh/g in favor of the doped compound for both charge and discharge comparisons, comparing from 0 to 60 cycles, going from 1000 mAh/g to 450 mAh/g in the first 60 cycles for the doped compound, and from 750 mAh/g to 200 mAh/g for the pure MnO.

A comparison using Graphene Quantum Dots for a NP-SiAl compound not only shows higher discharge capacities but also an improved electrochemical impedance spectroscopy plot, indicating that the battery has better electrical conductivity. For the case of the NP-SiAl/GQDs, the value of -Z´´/ohm reaches a peak of 300, for 250 Z´/ohm, while for the pure NP-SiAl, the peak of 300 -Z´´/ohm is reached at 650 Z´/ohm.

==== Energy in QDs ====
In terms of energy, each individual quantum dot presents an energy level which is compared to that of an atom. Extending this property, an artificial lattice (made out of QDs) would have an energy band structure similar to the one of a crystalline semiconductor.

The energy level of a dot is dependent on the amount of charge in it and its capacitance.The energy present in electrons is proportional to the square of the wavelength, which makes the energy levels to rise quickly

==== Common QDs for batteries ====
Carbon quantum dots and Graphite quantum dots are the main types of quantum dots used in batteries.

The graphene quantum dots are made out of graphene sheets which are attached among them, forming a morphology similar to a 2D-disk.

The carbon quantum dots have an isotropic spherical structure and are made out of crystalline and amorphous carbon sheets.

From these common quantum dots, the graphene ones, are usually more crystalline than the carbon ones, this is because they have the crystallinity of a mono-layered and few-layered graphene.

=== Light-emitting diodes ===
Several methods are proposed for using quantum dots to improve existing light-emitting diode (LED) design, including quantum dot light-emitting diode (QD-LED or QLED) displays, and quantum dot white-light-emitting diode (QD-WLED) displays. Because quantum dots naturally produce monochromatic light, they can be more efficient than light sources which must be color filtered. QD-LEDs can be fabricated on a silicon substrate, which allows them to be integrated onto standard silicon-based integrated circuits or microelectromechanical systems.

=== Quantum dot displays ===
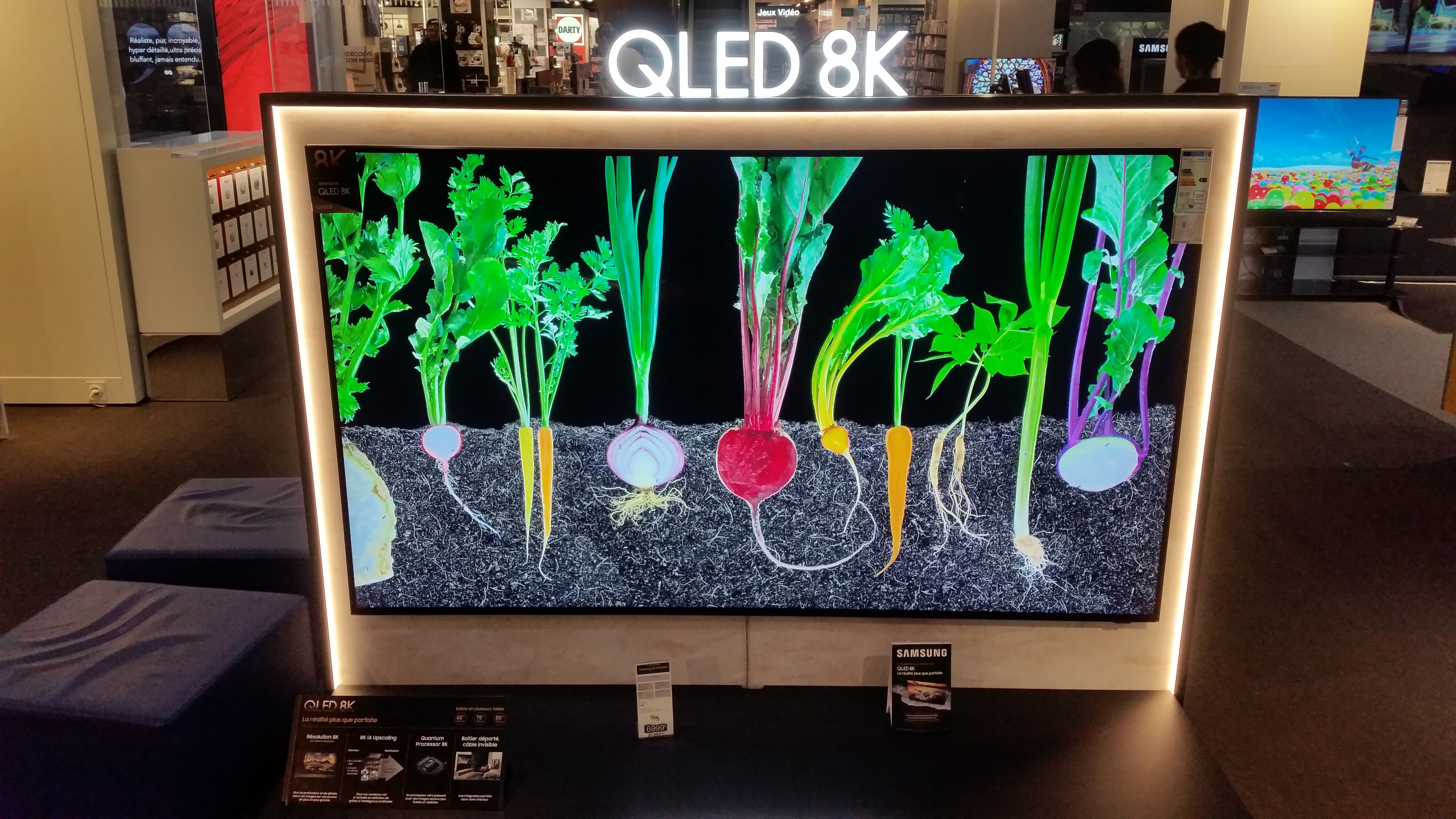
Samsung QLED TV 8K, 75 inches (190 cm)

Quantum dots are valued for displays because they emit light in very specific Gaussian distributions. This can result in a display with visibly more accurate colors.

A conventional color liquid crystal display (LCD) is usually backlit by fluorescent lamps (CCFLs) or conventional white LEDs that are color filtered to produce red, green, and blue pixels. Quantum dot displays use blue-emitting LEDs rather than white LEDs as the light sources. The converting part of the emitted light is converted into pure green and red light by the corresponding color quantum dots placed in front of the blue LED or using a quantum dot infused diffuser sheet in the backlight optical stack. Blank pixels are also used to allow the blue LED light to still generate blue hues. This type of white light as the backlight of an LCD panel allows for the best color gamut at lower cost than an RGB LED combination using three LEDs.

Another method by which quantum dot displays can be achieved is the electroluminescent (EL) or electro-emissive method. This involves embedding quantum dots in each individual pixel. These are then activated and controlled via an electric current application. Since this is often light emitting itself, the achievable colors may be limited in this method. Electro-emissive QD-LED TVs exist in laboratories only.

The ability of QDs to precisely convert and tune a spectrum makes them attractive for LCDs. Previous LCDs can waste energy converting red-green poor, blue-yellow rich white light into a more balanced lighting. By using QDs, only the necessary colors for ideal images are contained in the screen. The first commercial application of quantum dots was the Sony XBR X900A series of flat panel televisions released in 2013.

In June 2006, QD Vision announced technical success in making a proof-of-concept quantum dot display and show a bright emission in the visible and near infrared region of the spectrum. A QD-LED integrated at a scanning microscopy tip was used to demonstrate fluorescence near-field scanning optical microscopy (NSOM) imaging.

=== Photodetector devices ===
Quantum dot photodetectors (QDPs) can be fabricated either via solution-processing, or from conventional single-crystalline semiconductors. Conventional single-crystalline semiconductor QDPs are precluded from integration with flexible organic electronics due to the incompatibility of their growth conditions with the process windows required by organic semiconductors. On the other hand, solution-processed QDPs can be readily integrated with an almost infinite variety of substrates, and also postprocessed atop other integrated circuits. Such colloidal QDPs have potential applications in visible- and infrared-light cameras, machine vision, industrial inspection, spectroscopy, and fluorescent biomedical imaging.

=== Photocatalysts ===
Quantum dots also function as photocatalysts for the light driven chemical conversion of water into hydrogen as a pathway to solar fuel. In photocatalysis, electron hole pairs formed in the dot under band gap excitation drive redox reactions in the surrounding liquid. Generally, the photocatalytic activity of the dots is related to the particle size and its degree of quantum confinement. This is because the band gap determines the chemical energy that is stored in the dot in the excited state. An obstacle for the use of quantum dots in photocatalysis is the presence of surfactants on the surface of the dots. These surfactants (or ligands) interfere with the chemical reactivity of the dots by slowing down mass transfer and electron transfer processes. Also, quantum dots made of metal chalcogenides are chemically unstable under oxidizing conditions and undergo photo corrosion reactions.

=== Fundamental Materials Science ===
Quantum dots can also be used to study fundamental effects in materials science. By coupling two or more such quantum dots, an artificial molecule can be made, exhibiting hybridization even at room temperature. Precise assembly of quantum dots can form superlattices that act as artificial solid-state materials that exhibit unique optical and electronic properties.

== Theory ==
Quantum dots are theoretically described as a point-like, or zero dimensional (0D) entity. Most of their properties depend on the dimensions, shape, and materials of which QDs are made. Generally, QDs present different thermodynamic properties from their bulk materials. One of these effects is melting-point depression. Optical properties of spherical metallic QDs are well described by the Mie scattering theory.

== Quantum confinement in semiconductors ==
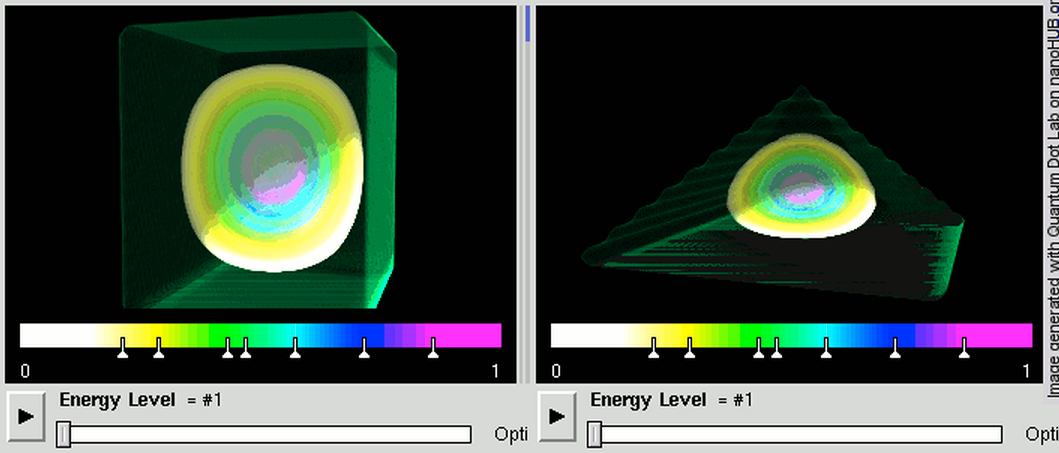
3D confined electron wave functions in a quantum dot. Here, rectangular and triangular-shaped quantum dots are shown. Energy states in rectangular dots are more s-type and p-type. However, in a triangular dot the wave functions are mixed due to confinement symmetry. (Click for animation)

The energy levels of a single particle in a quantum dot can be predicted using the particle in a box model in which the energies of states depend on the length of the box. For an exciton inside a quantum dot, there is also the Coulomb interaction between the negatively charged electron and the positively charged hole. By comparing the quantum dot's size to the exciton Bohr radius, three regimes can be defined. In the 'strong confinement regime', the quantum dot's radius is much smaller than the exciton Bohr radius, respectively the confinement energy dominates over the Coulomb interaction. In the 'weak confinement' regime, the quantum dot is larger than the exciton Bohr radius, respectively the confinement energy is smaller than the Coulomb interactions between electron and hole. The regime where the exciton Bohr radius and confinement potential are comparable is called the 'intermediate confinement regime'.

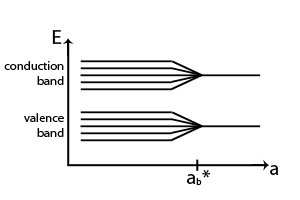
Splitting of energy levels for small quantum dots due to the quantum confinement effect. The horizontal axis is the radius, or the size, of the quantum dots and a_{b}* is the exciton's Bohr radius.

Band gap energy
The band gap can become smaller in the strong confinement regime as the energy levels split up. The exciton Bohr radius can be expressed as:

$$a^*_{\rm B}=\varepsilon_{\rm r}\left(\frac{m}{\mu}\right) a_{\rm B}$$

where a_{B} = 0.053 nm is the Bohr radius, m is the mass, μ is the reduced mass, and ε_{r} is the size-dependent dielectric constant (relative permittivity). This results in the increase in the total emission energy (the sum of the energy levels in the smaller band gaps in the strong confinement regime is larger than the energy levels in the band gaps of the original levels in the weak confinement regime) and the emission at various wavelengths. If the size distribution of QDs is not enough peaked, the convolution of multiple emission wavelengths is observed as a continuous spectra.
Confinement energy
The exciton entity can be modeled using the particle in the box. The electron and the hole can be seen as hydrogen in the Bohr model with the hydrogen nucleus replaced by the hole of positive charge and negative electron mass. Then the energy levels of the exciton can be represented as the solution to the particle in a box at the ground level (n = 1) with the mass replaced by the reduced mass. Thus by varying the size of the quantum dot, the confinement energy of the exciton can be controlled.

Bound exciton energy
There is Coulomb attraction between the negatively charged electron and the positively charged hole. The negative energy involved in the attraction is proportional to Rydberg's energy and inversely proportional to square of the size-dependent dielectric constant of the semiconductor. When the size of the semiconductor crystal is smaller than the exciton Bohr radius, the Coulomb interaction must be modified to fit the situation.

Therefore, the sum of these energies can be represented by Brus equation:

$$\begin{align}
E_\textrm{confinement} &= \frac{\hbar^2\pi^2}{2 a^2}\left(\frac{1}{m_{\rm e}} + \frac{1}{m_{\rm h}}\right) = \frac{\hbar^2\pi^2}{2\mu a^2}\\[6px]
E_\textrm{exciton}    &= -\frac{1}{\varepsilon_{\rm r}^2}\frac{\mu}{m_{\rm e}}R_y = -R_y^*\\[6px]
E &= E_\textrm{band gap} + E_\textrm{confinement} + E_\textrm{exciton}\\
&= E_\textrm{band gap} + \frac{\hbar^2\pi^2}{2\mu a^2} - R^*_y
\end{align}$$

where μ is the reduced mass, a is the radius of the quantum dot, m_{e} is the free electron mass, m_{h} is the hole mass, and ε_{r} is the size-dependent dielectric constant.

Although the above equations were derived using simplifying assumptions, they imply that the electronic transitions of the quantum dots will depend on their size. These quantum confinement effects are apparent only below the critical size. Larger particles do not exhibit this effect. This effect of quantum confinement on the quantum dots has been repeatedly verified experimentally and is a key feature of many emerging electronic structures.

The Coulomb interaction between confined carriers can also be studied by numerical means when results unconstrained by asymptotic approximations are pursued.

Besides confinement in all three dimensions (that is, a quantum dot), other quantum confined semiconductors include:

- Quantum wires, which confine electrons or holes in two spatial dimensions and allow free propagation in the third.
- Quantum wells, which confine electrons or holes in one dimension and allow free propagation in two dimensions.

=== Models ===
A variety of theoretical frameworks exist to model optical, electronic, and structural properties of quantum dots. These may be broadly divided into quantum mechanical, semiclassical, and classical.

=== Quantum mechanics ===
Quantum mechanical models and simulations of quantum dots often involve the interaction of electrons with a pseudopotential or random matrix.

==== Semiclassical ====
Semiclassical models of quantum dots frequently incorporate a chemical potential. For example, the thermodynamic chemical potential of an N-particle system is given by

$$\mu(N) = E(N) - E(N-1)$$

whose energy terms may be obtained as solutions of the Schrödinger equation. The definition of capacitance,

$$\frac{1}{C} \equiv \frac{\Delta V}{\Delta Q}$$

with the potential difference

$$\Delta V = \frac{\Delta \mu}{e} = \frac{\mu(N+\Delta N) -\mu(N)}{e}$$

may be applied to a quantum dot with the addition or removal of individual electrons,

$$\Delta N = 1 \quad \text{and} \quad \Delta Q = e$$

Then

$$C(N) = \frac{e^2}{\mu(N+1)-\mu(N)} = \frac{e^2}{I(N)-A(N)}$$

is the quantum capacitance of a quantum dot, where we denoted by I(N) the ionization potential and by A(N) the electron affinity of the N-particle system.

==== Classical mechanics ====
Classical models of electrostatic properties of electrons in quantum dots are similar in nature to the Thomson problem of optimally distributing electrons on a unit sphere.

The classical electrostatic treatment of electrons confined to spherical quantum dots is similar to their treatment in the Thomson, or plum pudding model, of the atom.

The classical treatment of both two-dimensional and three-dimensional quantum dots exhibit electron shell-filling behavior. A "periodic table of classical artificial atoms" has been described for two-dimensional quantum dots. As well, several connections have been reported between the three-dimensional Thomson problem and electron shell-filling patterns found in naturally occurring atoms found throughout the periodic table. This latter work originated in classical electrostatic modeling of electrons in a spherical quantum dot represented by an ideal dielectric sphere.

== History ==
For thousands of years, glassmakers were able to make colored glass by adding different dusts and powdered elements such as silver, gold and cadmium and then used different temperatures to produce shades of glass. In the 19th century, scientists started to understand how glass color depended on elements and heating-cooling techniques. It was also found that for the same element and preparation, the color depended on the dust particles' size.

Herbert Fröhlich in the 1930s first explored the idea that material properties can depend on the macroscopic dimensions of a small particle due to quantum size effects.

The first quantum dots were synthesized in a glass matrix by Alexei A. Onushchenko and Alexey Ekimov in 1981 at the Vavilov State Optical Institute and independently in colloidal suspension by Louis E. Brus team at Bell Labs in 1983. They were first theorized by Alexander Efros in 1982. It was quickly identified that the optical changes that appeared for very small particles were due to quantum mechanical effects.

The term quantum dot first appeared in a paper first authored by Mark Reed in 1986. According to Brus, the term "quantum dot" was coined by Daniel S. Chemla while they were working at Bell Labs.

In 1993, David J. Norris, Christopher B. Murray and Moungi Bawendi at the Massachusetts Institute of Technology reported on a hot-injection synthesis method for producing reproducible quantum dots with well-defined size and with high optical quality. The method opened the door to the development of large-scale technological applications of quantum dots in a wide range of areas.

The Nobel Prize in Chemistry 2023 was awarded to Moungi Bawendi, Louis E. Brus and Alexey Ekimov "for the discovery and synthesis of quantum dots."

== See also ==
- Cadmium-free quantum dot
- Carbon quantum dot
- Core–shell semiconductor nanocrystal
- Langmuir–Blodgett film
- Mark Reed (physicist)
- Nanocrystal solar cell
- Paul Alivisatos
- Quantum dot laser
- Quantum dot single-photon source
- Quantum point contact
- Shuming Nie
- Superatom
- Trojan wave packet
- Uri Banin
