= Richard Bersohn =

- Born: May 13, 1925; New York City, New York
- Died: November 18, 2003 (aged 78); New York City, New York
- Education: Massachusetts Institute of Technology; Harvard University
- Children: 2
- Awards: Guggenheim Fellowship (1972); Herbert P. Broida Prize (1985)
- Scientific career
- Workplaces: Cornell University; Columbia University
- Doctoral advisor: John Hasbrouck Van Vleck
- Doctoral students: Louis Brus

Richard Bersohn (May 13, 1925 – November 18, 2003) was an American chemical physicist and Higgins Professor of Natural Science at Columbia University. He was known for his research in molecular photodissociation and chemical kinetics.

== Early life and education ==
Bersohn was born in New York City on May 13, 1925. He grew up on Upper West Side and attended Hunter College High School and Horace Mann School. He obtained a B.S. in chemistry from the Massachusetts Institute of Technology in 1943. Shortly after graduation, he entered the United States Army and worked on the Manhattan Project at the Oak Ridge National Laboratory. Upon completing his military service, Bersohn obtained a Ph.D. from Harvard University in 1949, studying under John Hasbrouck Van Vleck. He did his thesis in dipole interactions in nuclear magnetic resonance (NMR).

== Career ==
Bersohn joined the faculty of Cornell University in 1951 as an assistant professor. He moved to Columbia University in 1959 and remained there for the rest of his career, becoming full professor in 1966 and Higgins Professor of Natural Science from 1986 to his death in 2003. He served as chair of the chemistry department from 1990 to 1996.

At Columbia, Bersohn pioneered the study of biophysics and used Förster resonance energy transfer and NMR methods to study the tertiary structure of proteins. He also invented "photolysis mapping" to study the photophysical and photochemical properties of molecules. He was the first to prove that certain rotating molecules can dissociate upon interacting with light before they complete a rotation. His students at Columbia included Louis E. Brus, a co-recipient of the 2023 Nobel Prize in Chemistry.

Bersohn was elected to the American Academy of Arts and Sciences in 1962, received a Guggenheim Fellowship in 1971, and was named to the National Academy of Sciences in 1985. He also received the Herbert P. Broida Prize from the American Physical Society. He also held advisory positions at the Brookhaven National Laboratory and the National Research Council as well as an adjunct appointment at the Weizmann Institute of Science.

== Personal life ==
Bersohn died on November 18, 2003, in New York City. He was survived by his wife, four children, and four grandchildren.
