= Alexander Efros =

Russian physicist

Alexander Lvovich Efros (Russian: Александр Львович Эфрос) is a Russian physicist. Efros is the co-discoverer of semiconducting nanocrystals known as quantum dots.

Efros graduated as a physical engineer in 1973 from the Leningrad Technological Institute and received his doctorate there in 1978. He was a scientist at the Ioffe Institute in Leningrad from 1981 to 1990, at which time he moved to the West.

In the 1980s, Alexey Ekimov, Alexei A. Onuschenko and Efros, discovered semiconductor nanocrystals while studying doped glasses. They correctly determined the quantum mechanical origin of the size-dependent optical properties of nanocrystals.

He was at the Technical University of Munich from 1990 to 1992, at the Massachusetts Institute of Technology as visiting scientist from 1992 to 1993. Since 1993 he has been an advisor at the United States Naval Research Laboratory.

In 2001, Efros became a Fellow of the American Physical Society. He received the R. W. Wood Prize in 2006 along with Ekimov and Louis E. Brus. In the Alexander von Humboldt Prize in 2008 for his work on quantum dots. In 2013, he received the E. F. Gross Medal of the Russian Optical society for pioneering nanocrystal research.
