= Louis E. Brus =

American chemist (1943–2026)

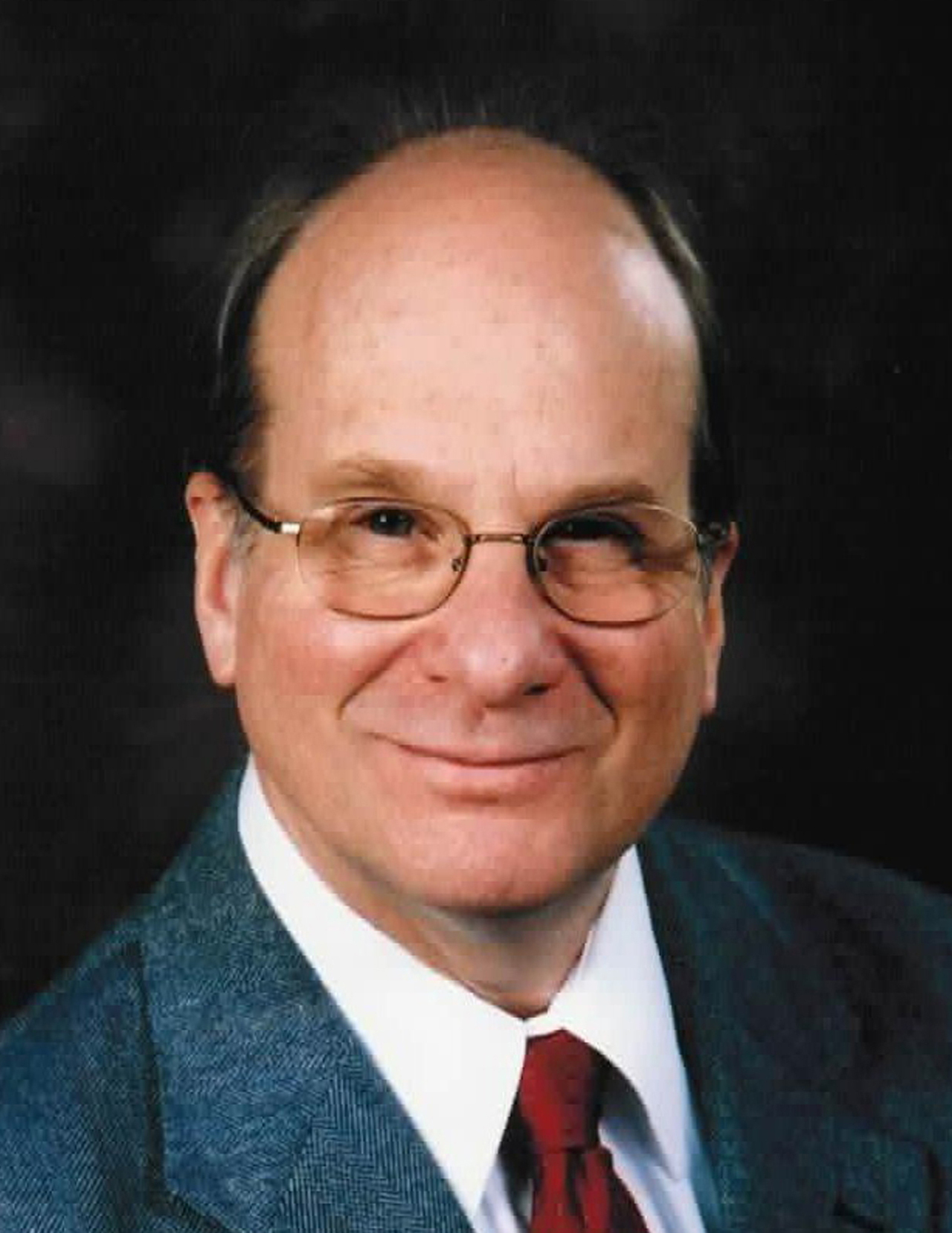
- Brus in 2008
- Born: August 10, 1943; Cleveland, Ohio, U.S.
- Died: January 11, 2026 (aged 82); Hastings-on-Hudson, New York, U.S.
- Education: Rice University (BS); Columbia University (PhD)
- Known for: Quantum dots Brus equation
- Awards: Irving Langmuir Prize in Chemical Physics (2001); National Academy of Sciences (2004); R. W. Wood Prize (2006); Kavli Prize (2008); Willard Gibbs Award (2009); NAS Award in Chemical Sciences (2010); Bower Award and Prize for Achievement in Science (2012); Nobel Prize in Chemistry (2023)
- Scientific career
- Fields: Chemistry; Chemical physics Nanotechnology
- Workplaces: US Naval Research Laboratory Bell Telephone Laboratory Columbia University
- Thesis: Lifetime Shortening of Na(3^{2p}) and T(7^{2S}) Quenched by Halogens (1969)
- Doctoral advisor: Richard Bersohn

Louis Eugene Brus (August 10, 1943 – January 11, 2026) was an American chemist, and the Samuel Latham Mitchell Professor of Chemistry at Columbia University. He was the co-discoverer of the colloidal semi-conductor nanocrystals known as quantum dots. In 2023, he was awarded the Nobel Prize in Chemistry.

== Early life and education ==
Louis Eugene Brus was born in Cleveland, Ohio, on August 10, 1943. During high school in Roeland Park, Kansas, he developed an interest in chemistry and physics.

He entered Rice University in 1961 with a Naval Reserve Officers Training Corps (NROTC) college scholarship, which required him to participate in NROTC activities at sea as a midshipman. In 1965, he graduated from Rice with a B.S. degree in chemical physics, and then moved to Columbia University for his doctoral research. For his dissertation, he worked on the photodissociation of sodium iodide vapor, under the supervision of Richard Bersohn. After obtaining his Ph.D. degree in chemical physics in 1969, Brus returned to the Navy as a lieutenant and served as a scientific staff officer in collaboration with Lin Ming-chang, at the United States Naval Research Laboratory in Washington, D.C.

Under the recommendation of Bersohn, Brus left the Navy permanently and joined AT&T Bell Laboratories in 1973, where he did the work that led to the discovery of quantum dots. In 1996, Brus left Bell Labs and joined the faculty in the Department of Chemistry at Columbia University.

== Work on quantum dots ==
Brus was a foundational figure in the research and development of quantum dots. Quantum dots are tiny semiconducting crystals whose nanoscale size gives them unique optical and electronic properties. He was independently the first to synthesize them in a solution in 1982. At the time, he was studying organic photochemistry on cadmium sulfide particle surfaces using pump–probe Raman spectroscopy, looking for possible applications for solar-energy. He noticed that the optical properties of the crystals changed after leaving them for 24 hours. He attributed this change in band gap energy to Ostwald ripening when the crystal increased in size. Brus provided the theoretical framework for understanding the behavior of quantum dots in terms of quantum size effects. He identified the connection between the particle size of semiconductors and the wavelength of the light they emit, now known as the Brus equation.

Brus tried to contact researchers in the Soviet Union. It was in 1990 that he finally met Alexey Ekimov and Alexander Efros, who had first developed the semiconductor nanocrystals in glass in 1981 under more rudimentary conditions, however their research was not available in the United States.

At Bell Labs, Brus worked with postdoc researchers Paul Alivisatos and Moungi Bawendi in a research project with organometallic synthetic chemist Michael L. Steigerwald on reducing the size of the quantum dots.

== Death ==
Brus died of myelodysplastic syndrome in Hastings-on-Hudson, New York on January 11, 2026, at the age of 82.

== Awards and honors ==
Brus was elected a fellow of the American Academy of Arts and Sciences in 1998, a member of the United States National Academy of Sciences in 2004, and was a member of the Norwegian Academy of Science and Letters.

He received the Distinguished Alumni Award from the Association of Rice University Alumni in 2010. He was co-recipient of the 2006 R. W. Wood Prize of the Optical Society of America "for the discovery of nanocrystal quantum dots and pioneering studies of their electronic and optical properties" shared with Alexander Efros and Alexey Ekimov. He also received the inaugural Kavli Prize for nanoscience along with Sumio Iijima in 2008 for "their large impact in the development of the nanoscience field of the zero and one dimensional nanostructures in physics, chemistry and biology". In 2009 he was awarded the Willard Gibbs Award "for his leading role in the creation of chemical quantum dots". Brus was chosen for the 2010 NAS Award in Chemical Sciences. In 2012 he received the Franklin Institute's Bower Award and Prize for Achievement in Science, and was selected as a Clarivate Citation laureate in Chemistry "for discovery of colloidal semiconductor nanocrystals (quantum dots)".

In 2023, Brus was awarded the Nobel Prize in Chemistry jointly with Ekimov and Moungi Bawendi "for the discovery and synthesis of quantum dots". Bawendi had worked as a postdoc with Brus, when they were in Bell Labs.

He was inducted as a 2025 fellow of the National Academy of Inventors.

== Selected publications ==
- Rossetti, R.; Brus, L. (November 1982). "Electron-hole recombination emission as a probe of surface chemistry in aqueous cadmium sulfide colloids". The Journal of Physical Chemistry. 86 (23): 4470–4472. Bibcode:1982JPhCh..86.4470R. doi:10.1021/j100220a003. ISSN 0022-3654.
- Brus, L. E. (December 1, 1983). "A simple model for the ionization potential, electron affinity, and aqueous redox potentials of small semiconductor crystallites". The Journal of Chemical Physics. 79 (11): 5566–5571. Bibcode:1983JChPh..79.5566B. doi:10.1063/1.445676. ISSN 0021-9606.
- Brus, L. E. (May 1, 1984). "Electron–electron and electron-hole interactions in small semiconductor crystallites: The size dependence of the lowest excited electronic state". The Journal of Chemical Physics. 80 (9): 4403–4409. Bibcode:1984JChPh..80.4403B. doi:10.1063/1.447218. ISSN 0021-9606.
- Brus, Louis (June 1986). "Electronic wave functions in semiconductor clusters: experiment and theory". The Journal of Physical Chemistry. 90 (12): 2555–2560. Bibcode:1986JPhCh..90.2555B. doi:10.1021/j100403a003. ISSN 0022-3654.
- Nirmal, M.; Dabbousi, B. O.; Bawendi, M. G.; Macklin, J. J.; Trautman, J. K.; Harris, T. D.; Brus, L. E. (October 1996). "Fluorescence intermittency in single cadmium selenide nanocrystals". Nature. 383 (6603): 802–804. Bibcode:1996Natur.383..802N. doi:10.1038/383802a0. ISSN 1476-4687. S2CID 4315737.
- Bawendi, M G; Steigerwald, M L; Brus, L E (October 1990). "The Quantum Mechanics of Larger Semiconductor Clusters ("Quantum Dots")". Annual Review of Physical Chemistry. 41 (1): 477–496. Bibcode:1990ARPC...41..477B. doi:10.1146/annurev.pc.41.100190.002401. ISSN 0066-426X.
- Michaels, Amy M.; Nirmal, M.; Brus, L. E. (November 1, 1999). "Surface Enhanced Raman Spectroscopy of Individual Rhodamine 6G Molecules on Large Ag Nanocrystals". Journal of the American Chemical Society. 121 (43): 9932–9939. Bibcode:1999JAChS.121.9932M. doi:10.1021/ja992128q. ISSN 0002-7863.
- Lee, Changgu; Yan, Hugen; Brus, Louis E.; Heinz, Tony F.; Hone, James; Ryu, Sunmin (May 25, 2010). "Anomalous Lattice Vibrations of Single- and Few-Layer MoS 2". ACS Nano. 4 (5): 2695–2700. arXiv:1005.2509. Bibcode:2010ACSNa...4.2695L. doi:10.1021/nn1003937. ISSN 1936-0851. PMID 20392077. S2CID 6543876.
