= Brus equation =

Quantum dot nanocrystal equation

The Brus equation or confinement energy equation can be used to describe the emission energy of quantum dot semiconductor nanocrystals in terms of the band gap energy E_{gap}, the Planck constant h, the radius of the quantum dot r, as well as the effective mass of the excited electron m_{e}* and of the excited hole m_{h}*. The equation was named after Louis E. Brus, who discovered it in 1986.

The radius of the quantum dot affects the wavelength of the emitted light due to quantum confinement, and this equation describes the effect of changing the radius of the quantum dot on the wavelength λ of the emitted light (and thereby on the emission energy ΔE = hc/λ, where c is the speed of light). This is useful for calculating the radius of a quantum dot from experimentally determined parameters.

The overall equation is

$$\Delta E(r) = E_\mathrm{gap} + \frac{h^2}{8r^2} \left(1/m_\mathrm{e}^* + 1/m_\mathrm{h}^*\right) .$$

E_{gap}, m_{e}*, and m_{h}* are unique for each nanocrystal composition. For example, with cadmium selenide (CdSe) nanocrystals:

E_{gap} (CdSe) = 1.74 eV = 2.8×10^{−19} J,
m_{e}* (CdSe) = 0.13 m_{e} = 1.18×10^{−31} kg,
m_{h}* (CdSe) = 0.45 m_{e} = 4.10×10^{−31} kg.
