= Copper chloride =

Copper chloride may refer to:

- Copper(I) chloride (cuprous chloride), CuCl, mineral name nantokite
- Copper(II) chloride (cupric chloride), CuCl_{2}, mineral name eriochalcite
