= CAT phones =

Rugged mobile phone

Cat Phones
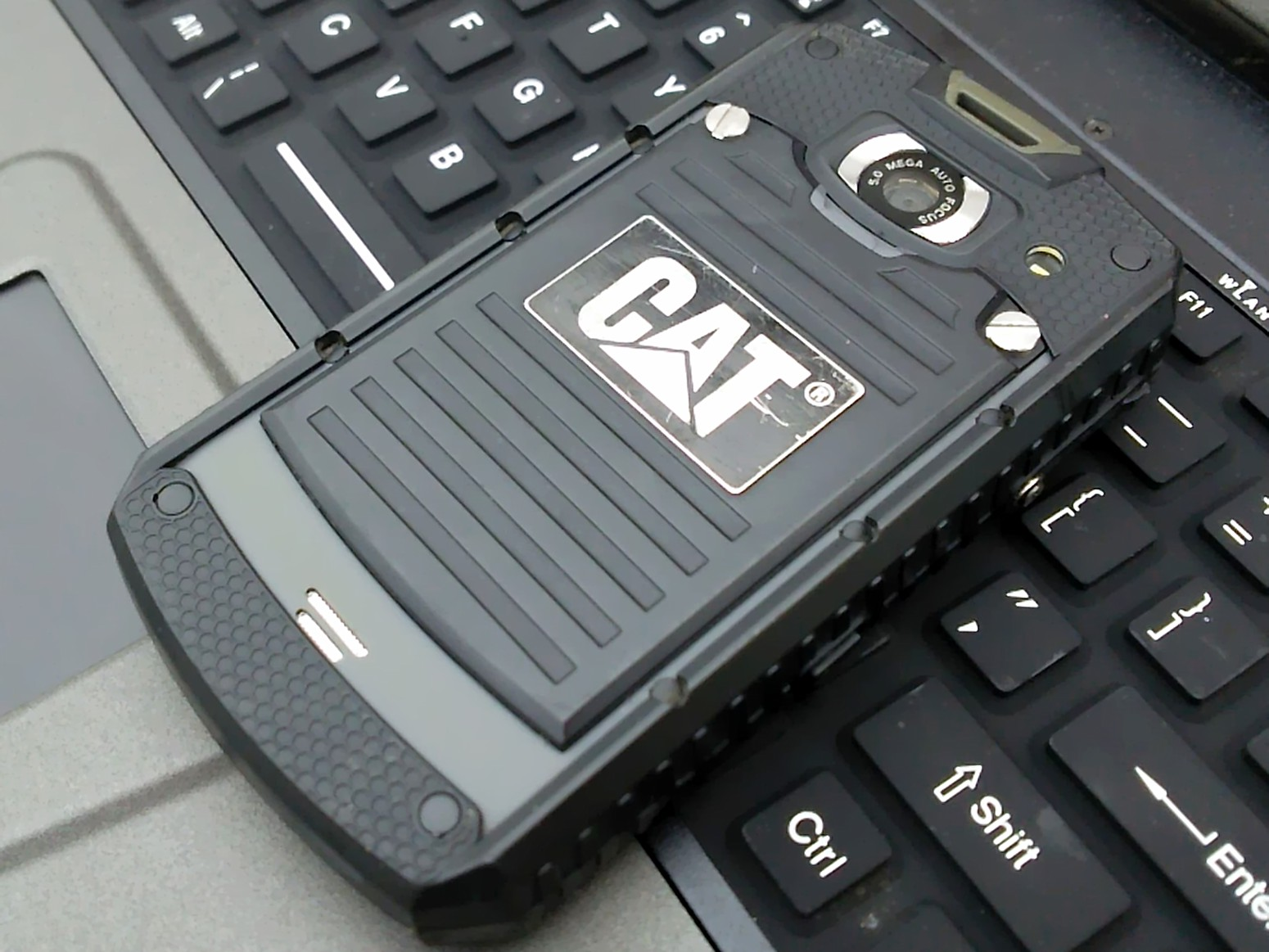
- Rear of CAT B10 smartphone, showing durable casing materials
- Type: Division
- Industry: Telecommunications, consumer electronics
- Founded: 2012; 14 years ago
- Headquarters: Previously: Bullitt Group Ltd One Valpy, Valpy Street, Reading, Berkshire, England, RG1 1AR
- Area served: Worldwide
- Products: Mobile phones, rugged smartphones
- Brands: CAT
- Owner: Caterpillar Inc.
- Website: www.CatPhones.com

CAT phones is a range of toughened and strengthened mobile phones that was developed and marketed from 2012 to 2024 by British company Bullitt Group, under license from Caterpillar Inc., carrying the CAT branding. In 2025, Caterpillar announced they had licensed the range internationally to the Japanese/American manufacturer Orbic.

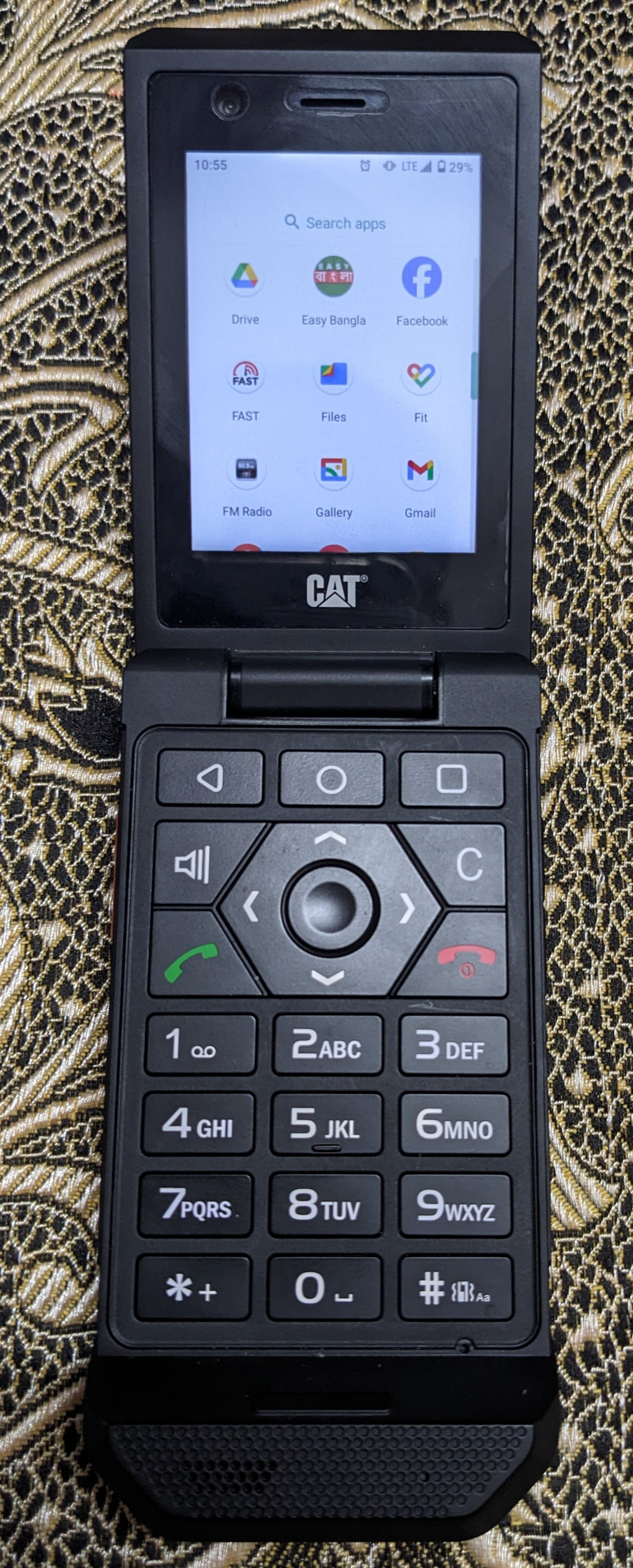
Cat S22 Flip with Android operating system and touch display

== Overview ==
The range was developed, manufactured and sold by Bullitt Mobile Ltd, part of the British telecommunications and consumer electronics technology company Bullitt Group Ltd, under exclusive license from Caterpillar Inc. starting in 2012.

Cat phones were toughened devices and included rugged smartphones. The range included standard feature phones, enhanced specification smartphones which operate on the Android operating system, and related accessories.

In early 2024 Bullitt Group closed down.

== List of models ==
List of Caterpillar-branded mobile phones
Category	Model	SoC	Year	Display	Rating	Special features
Smartphone	B10	Qualcomm MSM7227	2012	3.2 in (81 mm); 480×320 LCD	IP67 (1 m (3 ft)/30 min)	
Camera phone	B25	MediaTek MT6235	2012	2 in (51 mm); 240×320 LCD	IP67 (1 m (3 ft)/30 min)	
Camera phone	B100	MediaTek MT6276W	2013	2.2 in (56 mm); 240×320 LCD	IP67 (1 m (3 ft)/30 min), MIL-810G	
Smartphone	B15	MediaTek MT6577	2014	4 in (100 mm); 800×480 LCD	IP67, MIL-810G	
Smartphone	S50	Snapdragon 400 (MSM8926)	2014	4.7 in (120 mm); 1280×720 LCD	IP67, MIL-810G	
Smartphone	B15Q	MediaTek MT6582M	2015	4 in (100 mm); 800×480 LCD	IP67 (1 m (3 ft)/30 min), MIL-810G	No LTE support.
Camera phone	B30	Spreadtrum 7701	2015	2 in (51 mm); 176×220	IP67 (1 m (3 ft)/30 min)	
Smartphone	S30	Snapdragon 210 (MSM8909)	2015	4.5 in (110 mm); 854×480 LCD	IP68 (1 m (3 ft)/60 min), MIL-810G	
Smartphone	S40	Snapdragon 210 (MSM8909)	2015	4.7 in (120 mm); 960×540 LCD	IP68 (1 m (3 ft)/60 min), MIL-810G	
Smartphone	S60	Snapdragon 617	2016	4.7 in (120 mm); 1280×720 LCD	IP68 (2–5 m (7–16 ft)/1 hr), MIL-810G	Includes thermal camera from FLIR Systems
Smartphone	S31	Snapdragon 210 (MSM8909)	2017	4.7 in (120 mm); 1280×720 LCD	IP68 (1.2 m (4 ft)/35 min), MIL-810G	
Smartphone	S41	MediaTek Helio P20 (MT6757)	2017	5 in (130 mm); 1920×1080 LCD	IP68, MIL-810G	Can be used to charge other devices.
Camera phone	B35	Qualcomm 8905	2018	2.4 in (61 mm); 240×320	IP67 (1.2 m (4 ft)/35 min)	KaiOS
Smartphone	S61	Snapdragon 630	2018	5.2 in (130 mm); 1920×1080 LCD	IP68 (3 m (9.8 ft)/1 hr), MIL-810G	Includes thermal camera from FLIR Systems
Camera phone	B26	Spreadtrum SC6531F	2019	2.4 in (61 mm); 240×320	IP68 (1.2 m (4 ft)/35 min), MIL-810G	Dual SIM
Smartphone	S48c	Snapdragon 630	2019	5 in (130 mm); 1920×1080 LCD	IP68 (1.2 m (4 ft)/30 min), MIL-810G	Only model to support CDMA
Smartphone	S52	MediaTek Helio P35	2019	5.65 in (144 mm); 1440×720 LCD	IP68 (1.5 m (5 ft)/35 min), MIL-810G	
Smartphone	S32	MediaTek Helio A20	2020	5.5 in (140 mm); 1440×720 LCD	IP68 (1.5 m (5 ft)/35 min), MIL-810H	Name updated from S32 to S42.
Smartphone	S42	MediaTek Helio A20	2020	5.5 in (140 mm); 1440×720 LCD	IP68 (1.5 m (5 ft)/35 min), MIL-810H	Name updated from S32 to S42.
Smartphone	S62 Pro	Snapdragon 660	2020	5.7 in (140 mm); 2160×1080 LCD	IP68 (1.5 m (5 ft)/35 min), MIL-810H	Includes thermal camera from FLIR Systems
Camera phone	B40	Unisoc T117	2021	2.4 in (61 mm) 240x320 TFT LCD	IP69 Drop: 1.8m	
Hybrid button and touch Smart feature phone	S22 Flip	Qualcomm QM215 Snapdragon 215	2021	2.8 in (71 mm); 480×640 TFT	IP68 (5 m (16 ft)/35 min), IP69K, MIL-810H	
Smartphone	S75	MediaTek Dimensity 930	2023	6.58 in (167 mm); 2220×1080 (FHD+) LCD	IP68 (5 m (16 ft)/35 min), IP69K, MIL-810H	Includes satellite emergency messaging from Bullitt.

== See also ==
- TUFF Phones
