= Panasonic Toughpad =

Series of tablet computer models

Panasonic Toughpad is a series of tablet computers developed and designed by Panasonic as a subset of its series of Toughbook rugged computers. The first Toughpad was unveiled on November 7, 2011 in the United States.

Toughpad tablets feature a fully rugged design certified to meet IP65 and MIL-STD-810G specifications for drops (up to 4 feet), shock, vibration, altitude, humidity and extreme temperatures. Built to most of the same specifications as the Toughbook line, they are designed for professional use and are used in a wide variety of industries, including construction, defense, public safety, emergency services, government, healthcare, law enforcement, manufacturing, oil & gas and telecom/utilities. They offer features not commonly found on consumer-oriented tablets and are ruggedized to withstand vibration, drops, spills, extreme temperature, and rough handling. Toughpad tablets are designed for lower failure rates than standard business devices, translating to less downtime, fewer repair expenses and a lower total cost of ownership.

== Current models ==
Availability of models varies by country.

=== Toughpad FZ-G1 ===
The Toughpad FZ-G1 is a fully rugged 10-inch Windows tablet featuring a 6th generation Intel Core i5 vPro processor, Microsoft Windows 10 Pro or Windows 7 downgrade, a user-removable battery providing up to 18 hours of continuous use and optional bridge battery. It weighs 2.4 lbs. for the standard configuration. and comes equipped with options for an integrated UHF radio-frequency identification (RFID) reader or contactless smart card reader, and optional certification for use in hazardous locations. An optional Opal-compliant, self-encrypting drive is also available.

=== Toughpad FZ-B2 ===
The Toughpad FZ-B2 is a rugged 7-inch tablet running the Android 4.4 operating system and is powered by a Quad-core Intel Celeron Processor. It has a fully rugged, MIL-STD-810G sealed IP65 dust and water-resistant design. Features include a quick-charging, user-replaceable battery with an optional bridge battery and high-capacity battery; a 5-point capacitive multi-touch screen that works with gloves, as well as with a fine tip stylus pen.

=== Toughpad FZ-M1 ===
The Toughpad FZ-M1 rugged 7-inch tablet PC features a thin, lightweight, rugged and fanless design. It offers two choices of Intel processors and features the Windows operating system and enterprise-grade security features such as Trusted Platform Module (TPM). It also has a sunlight-readable, glove-enabled touchscreen and full-shift battery life with a built-in bridge battery.

=== Toughpad FZ-R1 ===
The Toughpad FZ-R1 is the industry's first 7-inch all-in-one mobile point-of-sale tablet running Windows 8.1 for retail environments. Powered by an Intel Celeron processor, the tablet offers a fast-charging, user-replaceable full-shift battery with optional bridge battery and high-capacity battery, ten-point capacitive multi-touch screen, integrated EMV reader with PIN pad, encrypted magnetic stripe reader, optional POS cradle, and a wide range of configuration options.

=== Toughpad 4K ===
The Toughpad 4K is the world's first 20-inch tablet with a 4K resolution display. Available running Windows and built on the Intel vPro platform, it features a 230 pixel-per-inch IPS Alpha LCD with a 15:10 aspect ratio and wide viewing angles.

=== Toughpad FZ-E1 and Toughpad FZ-X1 ===
The Toughpad FZ-E1 and Toughpad FZ-X1 are fully rugged 5-inch handheld tablets. Although they are marketed as tablets, their design more resembles that of phablets, with optional smartphone-like voice and data connectivity. The Toughpad FZ-E1 is powered by Windows Embedded 8.1 Handheld (based on the Windows Phone platform) and the Toughpad FZ-X1 runs the Android 5.1 operating system. Standard on both models is an integrated Micro USB port, Wi-Fi 802.11 a/b/g/n/ac, near field communications (NFC), standalone GPS and Bluetooth v4.0 (Class 1).

Devices can face resistance to drops of up to 3m to concrete, fully sealed against dust and are submersible in up to 1.5 meter of water for up to 30 minutes, meeting IP68 certification requirements. The devices can operate in temperatures ranging from -20 °C to 60 °C, and are tested for resistance to impact, shock, vibration, altitude and extreme humidity.
