= Rugged smartphone =

Smartphone type

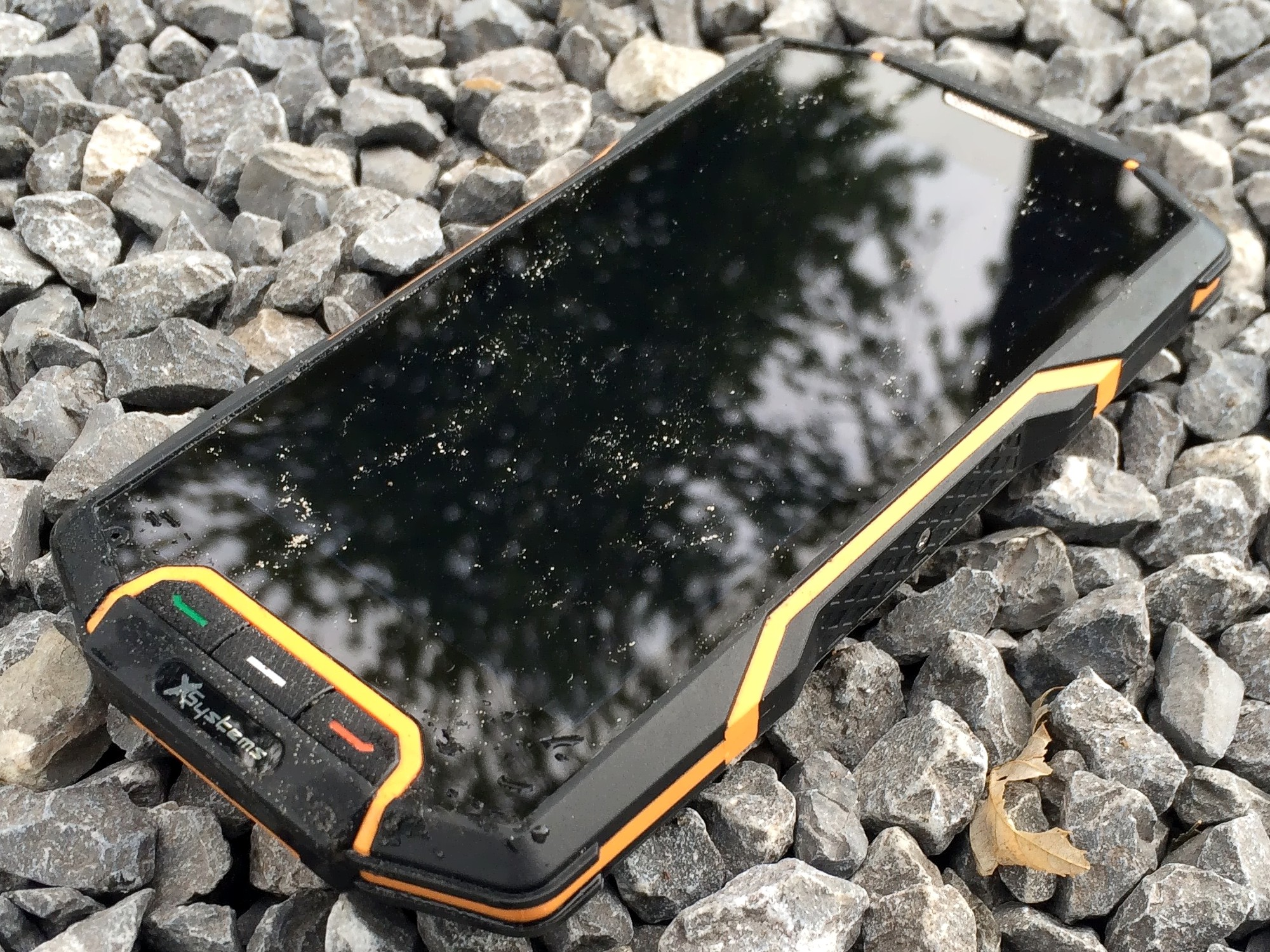
Rugged smartphone

A rugged smartphone is a specific type of toughened smartphone which is designed to be completely sealed within a durable housing to protect it against damage from water, shock, dust, and vibration. Rugged smartphones are designed to survive extreme weather and temperatures, accidental damage, and rough handling; making them ideal for working outdoors, or in harsh environments, along with use during extreme sports, such as sailing, rock climbing, etc. Most rugged smartphones have been tested to tough IP68 standards.

However, not all waterproof smartphones will be ruggedised.

Some companies that manufacture heavy equipment, construction equipment or offroad vehicles such as Caterpillar, JCB, DeWalt, and Land Rover entered the market in hopes of leveraging their reputation in those reliability demanding industries.

== Classification ==
There are three general types of rugged phone:

- Outdoor sports
- Military
- Stylish

== Functional requirements ==
The following IP code ratings for ingress protection (IP), as defined by the International Electrotechnical Commission (IEC) standard 60529 (equivalent to European standard EN 60529), are typically used for certifying various toughened and ruggedised smartphones.

=== Primary standard ===
IP54 — Solid particle (dust) protection level 5 (protection from harmful dust) and liquid ingress (waterproof) protection level 4 (protection from splashing water from any direction).

IP56 — Solid particle (dust) protection level 5 (protection from harmful dust) and liquid ingress (waterproof) protection level 6 (protection from high pressure water jets).

=== Intermediate standard ===
IP57 — Solid particle (dust) protection level 5 (protection from harmful dust) and liquid ingress (waterproof) protection level 7 (protection from full immersion at depths between 15 centimetres (5.9 inches) and 1 metre (3 feet 3 inches)).

=== Advanced (professional) standards ===
IP67 — Solid particle (dust) protection level 6 (protection from all dust) and liquid ingress (waterproof) protection level 7 (protection from full immersion at depths between 15 centimetres (5.9 inches) and 1 metre (3 feet 3 inches)).

IP68 — Solid particle (dust) protection level 6 (protection from all dust) and liquid ingress (waterproof) protection level 8 (protection from full immersion at depths determined by the manufacturer).

IP69K — In the IEC 60529 rating system for ingress protection (IP), IP6* refers to the product's ability to resist ingress of dust. The IP*9K refers to the product's ability to resist ingress of high temperature (steam) / high pressure water. If the device passes all these tests, then it can be considered as IP69K rated smartphone, and can be used in harsh environments with high pressure / steam cleaning.

=== Testing procedure per ISO 20653 ===
1. A spray nozzle that is fed with 80 degrees Celsius (176 degrees Fahrenheit) water at 80–100 bars (1,160–1,450 pounds per square inch) and a flow rate of 14–16 litres per minute (3.1–3.5 imperial gallons per minute; 3.7–4.2 US gallons per minute).
2. The nozzle is held 10–15 centimetres (3.9–5.9 inches) from the tested device at angles of 0°, 30°, 60°, and 90°, for 30 seconds each.
3. The test device places on a turntable that rotates once every 12 seconds.

=== MIL-STD-810G ===
MIL-STD-810G is a U.S. military standard that stipulates a level of durability for an item of equipment. Specifically, it means the equipment has been subjected to a series of twenty-nine (29) tests, including shock tests, vibration tests, and more. This means it should be field ready, or even 'combat ready' in principle. A lot of technology sold to the U.S. military must be MIL-STD-810G compliant.

== List of rugged smartphones ==
AGM
X2, X3
Aspera
R7, R8, R9, R10
Bittium
Tough Mobile, Tough Mobile 2, Tough Mobile 2 C
Blackview/OSCAL
Generally, all BVxxxx and BLxxxx phones. Examples: BV7000 Pro, BV9500 Pro, BL8800 Pro
Cat Phone
S40, S41, S50, S52, S60, Cat S61, S62
Crosscall's smartphones
Cubot
KingKong serie, DeWalt MD501
Doogee
V20 Pro, V31 GT, S40, S60, S70, Doogee S88 Pro, Doogee S90, S96, V Max
Gigaset
GX4 PRO, GX6 PRO
HMD
XR21
Homtom
HT20
Jesy
J20
Kyocera
DuraForce PRO 2
Oukitel's
WP series, WP100 Titan, WP200 Pro, WP300
Nokia
XR20, XR21
Samsung
Galaxy S4 Active, Galaxy S5 Active, Galaxy S6 Active, Galaxy S7 Active, Galaxy S8 Active, Galaxy Xcover, Galaxy Xcover Pro, Galaxy Xcover 6 Pro, Galaxy Xcover 7
Sonim
XP7, XP8, XP10, XP Pro
TUFF
T400 (4G)
Ulefone
Armor 2, Ulefone Power Armor 14 Pro
Unihertz/8849
Titan (2019), Tank 3 Pro, Tank X
Umidigi
BISON Series
Zebra
TC75x
FOSSiBOT
F117, F103
RugOne
Xever 7, Xever 7 Pro
HOTWAV
Hyper 8 Ultra, Cyber 18, Cyber X Pro

=== Rugged dumb phones ===
Cat Phone
B25, S22 Flip,
Evolveo
StrongPhone
Nokia
Nokia 5210, Nokia 3720 classic, Nokia 800 Tough
Aspera
R25, R25t, R32, R30, R40

== See also ==
- Emerging technologies
- Rugged computer
