= B25 =

B25, B-25 or B.25 may refer to:

- B-25 Mitchell, an American aircraft which saw service during World War II
- Blackburn B-25, a 1939 British Fleet Air Arm fighter aircraft
- B-25, a guitar model in the Gibson B series
- B25, a bus route on the Fulton Street Line (Brooklyn surface)
- Kota language (Gabon) (Guthrie code B.25)
- 25 amp, type B – a standard circuit breaker current rating
- MWfly B25, an Italian aircraft engine design
- Cat B25, a 2013 phone by Bullitt Group for Caterpillar Inc.
