= B22 =

B22 or B-22 may refer to:

== Science and technology ==
- B22, a bayonet mount size for a light bulb
- B22, an iceberg that calved from the Thwaites Ice Tongue in 2002
- HLA-B22, an HLA-B serotype
- AIDS dementia complex (ICD-10 code)

== Transportation ==
- Bundesstraße 22, a German road
- Chery B22, a 2008 Chinese Chery Automobile model
- Douglas XB-22, a proposed modification of the B-18 Bolo bomber
- MWfly B22, an Italian aircraft engine design
- Micro Aviation B22 Bantam, a New Zealand ultralight aircraft design

== Other uses ==
- Sicilian Defence (ECO code), in chess
