= TUFF Phones =

English strengthened mobile phone company

TUFF Phones Ltd
- Company type: Private limited company
- Industry: Telecommunications
- Founded: 5 November 2010; 15 years ago
- Founder: Howard Mark Cammell
- Defunct: 23 April 2024
- Headquarters: First Floor, 1-3 South Street, Chichester, West Sussex, England, PO19 1EH, UK
- Area served: Worldwide
- Key people: Kevin Lee Nessling (director)
- Products: Mobile phones, rugged smartphones
- Owner: Kevin Lee Nessling
- Website: TuffPhones.co.uk

TUFF Phones are strengthened mobile phones (including rugged smartphones) that were designed, manufactured, and sold by TUFF Phones Ltd. of England.

== Company history ==
TUFF Phones Ltd, registered in England and Wales, company registration number 07431588, was a United Kingdom (UK) based company specializing in mobile phones and smartphones. TUFF Phones was established in 2010 as a retailer of several different brands of mobile phones.

In 2014, the company began working on ideas regarding production of its own range of smartphones. A year later, talks began with a number of tier one manufacturers in mainland China on the pros and cons of different composite materials, shatterproof screens, and mobile operating systems. Production on TUFF's phones began in early 2016 at Shenzhen in China. A notice on the company website in July 2022 says that they are no longer in business. On November 21, 2023, TUFF Phones Ltd filed a application to deregister their company, and as of April 23, 2024, the company has been dissolved.

== Device ranges ==
The first generation of TUFF Phones products were released in Q3 2016, and featured four models of strengthened devices, including Gorilla glass touchscreens, and are certified to be dust-proof and waterproof.

=== 2016 range ===
- TUFF T300
- TUFF T400 (4G)
- TUFF T450
- TUFF T1000

TUFF Phones updated their range of handsets early in 2017, with the launch of two new handsets, the TUFF T400s and TUFF T1. They subsequently announced that the 2017 range will be increased later in Q2/Q3 2017, with the release of the TUFF T10 and TUFF T500.

=== 2017 range ===
- TUFF T400s
- TUFF T1
- TUFF T10
- TUFF T500

== Media ==
Certain generations of TUFF phones have implemented a removable tray that allows for the installation of two nano SIM cards; which allows the user of the phone to make use of two different phone numbers for calling and texting for example, or one nano SIM card with one microSD card; which allows the user of the phone to use a single phone number and to increase the amount of storage capacity in the phone for music, pictures, contacts, etc.

Sortable table of Smartphones from TUFF Phones
brand, model	release date	dimensions, mass	resolution (pixel)	display size	system on chip	random- access memory	internal data storage	expansion slot	rear camera (Mpx)	front camera (Mpx)	battery (mAh)	wireless network protocols	IP code	Android version
RugGear RG970	2012	155.6 mm × 82.9 mm × 15.55 mm (6.126 in × 3.264 in × 0.612 in) 245 grams (8.6 ounces)	960×540 qHD; 16:9	5.3 in (13.5 cm) capacitive multi-touch screen	MediaTek MT6577 (dual-core ARM Cortex-A9 1.0 GHz CPU & PowerVR SGX531 Ultra 522 MHz GPU)	1 GB	8 GB	up to 32 GB microSD	8 1080p video	2	2,900	Dual SIM, quad-band, 3G, Wi-Fi, GPS + A-GPS, Bluetooth; LE, FM radio	— MIL-STD-810G	Jelly; Bean; 4.1.2
CAT S40	2016	144.9 mm × 74.1 mm × 12.5 mm (5.70 in × 2.92 in × 0.49 in) 185 grams (6.5 ounces)	960×540 qHD; 16:9	4.7 in (11.9 cm) IPS; Gorilla Glass 4	Qualcomm Snapdragon 210 'MSM8909' (quad-core ARM Cortex-A7 1.1 GHz CPU & Adreno 200 400 MHz GPU)	1 GB (533 MHz LPDDR)	16 GB	up to 64 GB microSD	8	2	3,000	Single SIM, quad-band, 3G, 4G, Wi-Fi, Bluetooth 4.1, Bluetooth; LE	IP68 MIL-STD-810G	Lollipop; 5.1
TUFF T300	2016; Q3	140.4 mm × 75.8 mm × 16.3 mm (5.53 in × 2.98 in × 0.64 in)	854×480 (~244 ppi); FWVGA	4.0 in (10.2 cm) OGS IPS; Gorilla Glass 2	MediaTek MT6582 (quad-core ARM Cortex-A7 1.3 GHz CPU & Mali-400 MP2 500 MHz GPU)	1 GB (533 MHz LPDDR)	8 GB	up to 64 GB microSD	5	0.3	2,800 (removable)	Dual SIM, quad-band, 3G, Wi-Fi, Bluetooth 4.1	IP68	KitKat; 4.4
TUFF T400	2016; Q3	140.4 mm × 75.8 mm × 16.3 mm (5.53 in × 2.98 in × 0.64 in)	854×480 (~244 ppi); FWVGA	4.0 in (10.2 cm) OGS IPS; Gorilla Glass 2	MediaTek MT6735 (quad-core ARM Cortex-A53 1.3 GHz CPU & Mali-T720 MP2 650 MHz GPU)	2 GB (533 MHz LPDDR)	16 GB	up to 64 GB microSD	13	5	2,800 (removable)	Dual SIM, quad-band, 4G, Wi-Fi, Bluetooth 4.1	IP68	Lollipop; 5.1
TUFF T450	2016; Q3	149 mm × 75.6 mm × 14.8 mm (5.87 in × 2.98 in × 0.58 in)	720×1280 (~312 ppi); FWVGA	4.7 in (11.9 cm) TFT IPS; Gorilla Glass 2	MediaTek MT6735 (quad-core ARM Cortex-A53 1.3 GHz CPU & Mali-T720 MP2 650 MHz GPU)	2 GB (533 MHz LPDDR)	16 GB	up to 64 GB microSD	13	5	3,800	Dual SIM Standby (x1 standard size SIM & x1 micro SIM card), quad-band, 4G, Wi-Fi, Bluetooth 4.1	IP68	Lollipop; 5.1
TUFF T1000	2016; Q3	144 mm × 74 mm × 12.6 mm (5.67 in × 2.91 in × 0.50 in)	720×1280 (~312 ppi); FWVGA	4.7 in (11.9 cm) IPS HD; Gorilla Glass 4	MediaTek MT6735P (quad-core ARM Cortex-A53 1.0 GHz CPU & Mali-T720 MP2 650 MHz GPU)	2 GB (533 MHz LPDDR)	16 GB	up to 32 GB microSD	8	5	3,000	Dual SIM (x2 micro SIM cards), 4G, Wi-Fi, Bluetooth 4.0	IP68	Lollipop; 5.1
TUFF T400s	2017; Q1	146 mm × 75.9 mm × 13.95 mm (5.748 in × 2.988 in × 0.549 in)	720×1280 (~294 ppi); FWVGA	5.0 in (12.7 cm) IPS HD; Gorilla Glass 4	MediaTek MT6737T (quad-core ARM Cortex-A53 1.5 GHz CPU & Mali-T720 MP2 650 MHz GPU)	2 GB (733 MHz LPDDR3)	16 GB	up to 128 GB microSD (Located in SIM Card Tray)	13	5	5,000	Dual SIM (x2 nano SIM cards or x1 nano SIM & x1 microSD card for storage), 4G, Wi-Fi, Bluetooth 4.0	IP68	Marshmallow 6.0
TUFF T1	2017; Q1	145.4 mm × 75 mm × 10.3 mm (5.72 in × 2.95 in × 0.41 in)	720×1280 (~294 ppi); FWVGA	5.0 in (12.7 cm) IPS HD; Gorilla Glass 4	MediaTek MT6737T (quad-core ARM Cortex-A53 1.5 GHz CPU & Mali-T720 MP2 650 MHz GPU)	3 GB (733 MHz LPDDR3)	32 GB	up to 128 GB microSD (Located in SIM Card Tray)	8.0MP (Interpolation to 13.0MP) (Sony IMX219 sensor)	2.0MP (Interpolation to 5.0MP)	3,000	Dual SIM (x2 nano SIM cards or x1 nano SIM & x1 microSD card for storage), 4G, Wi-Fi, Bluetooth 4.0	IP68	Marshmallow 6.0
TUFF T10	2017; Q2	145 mm × 75 mm × 10.8 mm (5.71 in × 2.95 in × 0.43 in)	720×1280 (~320 ppi); FWVGA	4.7 in (11.9 cm) LTPS-TFT HD; Gorilla Glass 3	MediaTek MT6737 (quad-core ARM Cortex-A53 1.3 GHz CPU & Mali-T720 MP2 650 MHz GPU)	2 GB (640 MHz LPDDR3)	16 GB	up to 64 GB microSD (Located in SIM Card Tray)	8.0	2.0	3,000	Dual SIM (x2 nano SIM cards or x1 nano SIM & x1 microSD card for storage), 4G, Wi-Fi, Bluetooth 4.0	IP68	Nougat 7.0
TUFF T500	2017; Q3	158 mm × 77.2 mm × 14.8 mm (6.22 in × 3.04 in × 0.58 in)	720×1280 (~282 ppi); FWVGA	5.7 in (14.5 cm) IPS Incell; Gorilla Glass	MediaTek MT6739 (quad-core ARM Cortex-A53 1.5 GHz CPU & PowerVR GE8100 MP2 570 MHz GPU)	3 GB (667 MHz LPDDR3)	32 GB	up to 128 GB microSD (Located in SIM Card Tray)	13.0	8.0	5,000	Dual SIM (x2 nano SIM cards or x1 nano SIM & x1 microSD card for storage), 4G, Wi-Fi, Bluetooth 4.0	IP69	Oreo 8.1
