= Cat S60 =

Smartphone from Caterpillar Inc.

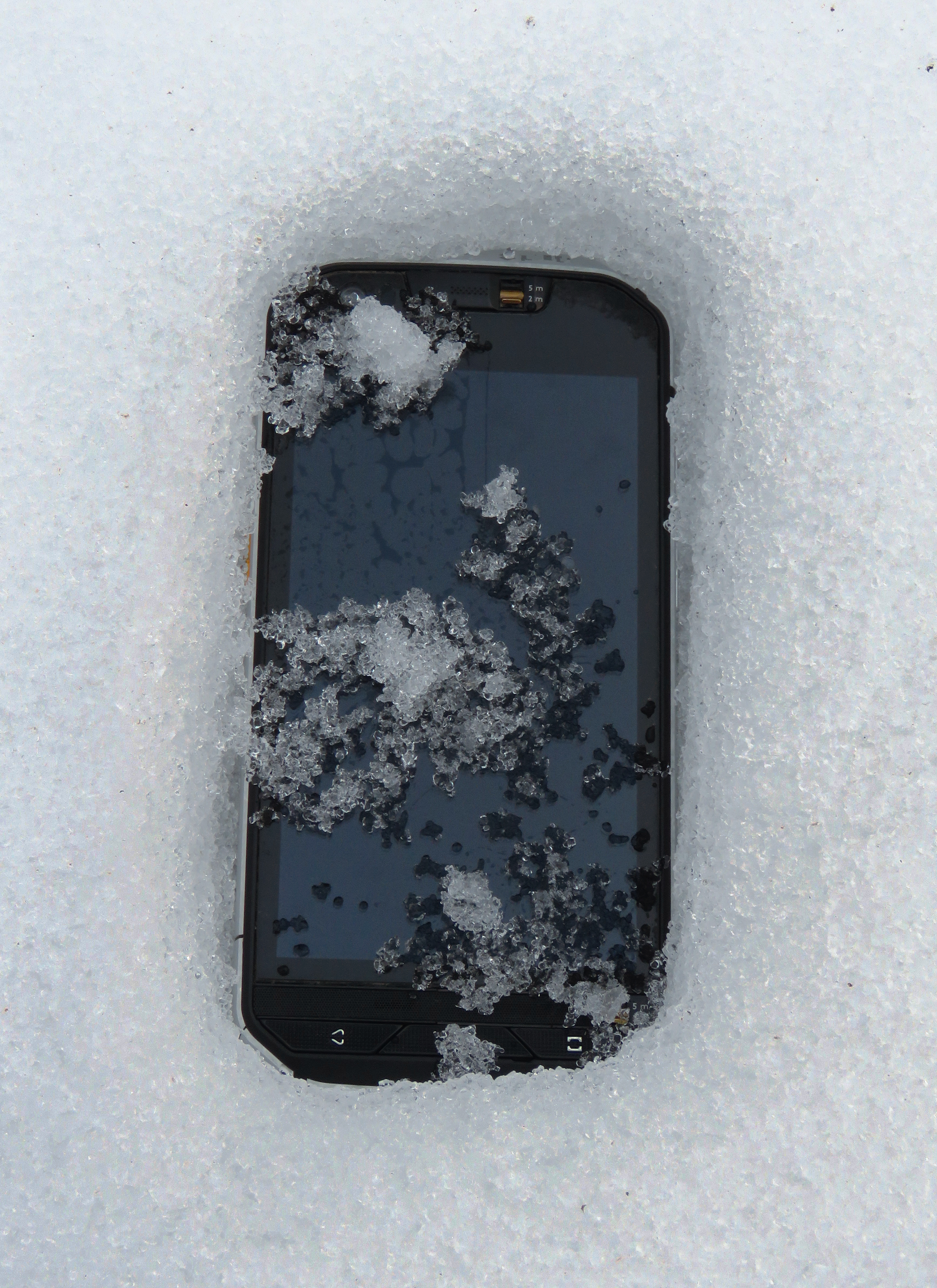
- The CAT S60 is advertised as the most weatherproof smartphone available.
- Manufacturer: Bullitt Group
- Type: Rugged smartphone
- Series: Cat phones
- First released: June 30, 2016; 10 years ago
- Successor: Cat S61
- Compatible networks: GSM/GPRS/EDGE/LTE GSM (850, 900, 1800, and 1900 MHz)
- Operating system: Android 6.0 "Marshmallow"
- System-on-chip: Qualcomm Snapdragon 617
- CPU: Octa-core 1.5 GHz Cortex-A53
- GPU: Adreno 405
- Memory: 3 GB RAM
- Storage: 32 GB
- Removable storage: microSD, up to 256 GB (dedicated slot)
- Battery: 3,800 mAh; Non-removable Li-Ion rechargeable Li-ion
- Rear camera: 13 megapixel auto focus Dual-LED (Dual-tone) flash FLIR thermal camera (lepton module)
- Front camera: 5 megapixel
- Display: 720×1280 px, 312 ppi 4.7 in (12 cm) diagonal, IPS LCD panel with Corning Gorilla Glass 4
- Connectivity: 3.5 mm TRRS; A-GPS; Bluetooth 4.1, A2DP; Micro USB 2.0; Wi-Fi 802.11a/b/g/n/ac NFC
- Data inputs: Accelerometer; Capacitive touch-sensitive buttons Digital compass Microphone; Multi-touch capacitive touchscreen
- Other: Wi-Fi hotspot USB tethering FM Radio; Drop-to-concrete resistance up to 1.8 m MIL-STD-810G certified Water proof up to 5 m for 60 min

The Cat S60 is a mobile phone introduced in 2016 by Caterpillar Inc. within the Cat phones line and has since been succeeded by the Cat S61 and Cat S62 Pro. It is the first smartphone to include an integrated thermal imaging camera from FLIR and presently the world's most waterproof smartphone.

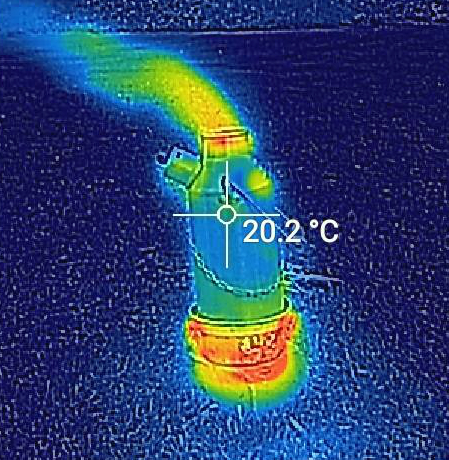
A thermal image captured by a CAT S60

== See also ==
- Samsung GT-B2710
