= Cheetah Mobile =

Chinese mobile internet company

Cheetah Mobile Inc.
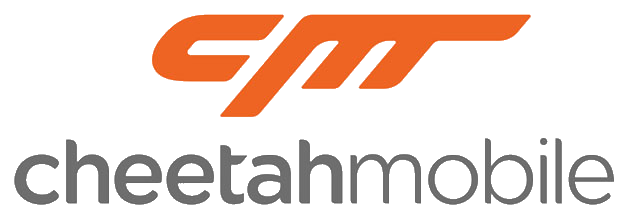
- Native name: 猎豹移动公司
- Type: Public
- Traded as: NYSE: CMCM
- Industry: Mobile apps, mobile gaming, internet security
- Founded: 2010; 16 years ago
- Headquarters: Beijing, China
- Key people: Sheng Fu (CEO)
- Revenue: ▲US$26.4 million (Q1 2024)
- Operating income: ▲US$ -11.2 million (Q1 2024)
- Net income: ▲US$ -11.1 million (Q1 2024)
- Total assets: ▲US$793.4 million (2023)
- Number of employees: 1,178
- Subsidiaries: OrionStar Robotics, Kika Tech, Live.me Inc., PhotoGrid Inc.
- Website: www.cmcm.com

Cheetah Mobile Inc. (Chinese: 猎豹移动公司) is a Chinese mobile internet company incorporated in the Cayman Islands and headquartered in Beijing.

== History ==
Chen Rui (陈睿 current CEO of Bilibili) founded Cheetah Mobile. The company was established in 2010 as a merger of Kingsoft Security (where Chen served as General Manager) and Conew Image (which was founded by Sheng Fu).

In 2014, Cheetah Mobile launched an IPO selling 13 million American depositary shares at US$14 per share, and thereby raised US$168 million. The IPO was managed by Morgan Stanley, JP Morgan Chase & Co., and Credit Suisse Group. Kingsoft and Tencent are major investors in Cheetah Mobile, holding 54% and 18% respectively.

In late 2015, Cheetah Mobile announced that it had entered into a global strategic partnership with Yahoo. The company incorporated Yahoo's search and native advertising platforms within its own apps.

In February 2016, Cheetah Mobile and Cubot launched the CheetahPhone, an Android 6.0 Marshmallow based smartphone, at MWC in Barcelona, Spain.

On April 1, 2015 Cheetah Mobile acquired French mobile advertising firm MobPartner, valued at $58 million. On August 2, 2016, Cheetah Mobile announced its acquisition of a French startup News Republic for $57 million. News Republic is a news aggregator.

On February 20, 2020, Cheetah Mobile was banned from Google Play due to their scheme of ad fraud, resulting in all of their apps being removed as part of a 600 app deletion.

In September 2022, the U.S. Securities and Exchange Commission charged the company's CEO and former President with insider trading. The SEC found that Sheng Fu, CEO, and Ming Xu, then-President and CTO of Cheetah Mobile, established a trading plan after learning of a significant drop in advertising revenues from their largest partner. In 2016, they sold 96,000 Cheetah Mobile shares under this plan, avoiding losses of approximately $203,290 and $100,127, respectively. Sheng Fu also made misleading public statements about the company's revenue trends and failed to disclose negative revenue trends in its 2016 reports. Both Fu and Xu violated antifraud provisions of the Securities Exchange Act, with Fu also violating provisions of the Securities Act, leading to cease-and-desist orders and civil penalties of $556,580 for Fu and $200,254 for Xu.

== Controversies ==
It was reported in 2014 that ads promoting Clean Master manipulated Android users with deceptive tactics when browsing websites within the app's advertising framework. In April 2014, Ferenc László Nagy from Sophos Labs captured some pop-up ads that led to Clean Master, warning the device had been infected with a virus.

In July 2014, Cheetah Mobile encouraged users to uninstall Google Chrome and replace it with Cheetah Mobile's own browser during Clean Master's clean up and optimization process. This practice allowed Cheetah Mobile to gain unfair position in the marketplace and led to a Google crackdown.

In December 2018, Cheetah Mobile was implicated in a massive click fraud scheme, leading Google to remove two of its apps from its Play Store. Cheetah Mobile has denied the charges. On February 20, 2020, Google banned nearly 600 apps on the Play Store including all Cheetah Mobile's apps "for violating our disruptive ads policy and disallowed interstitial policy."

As of 10 March 2020, all apps made by Cheetah Mobile, along with the benchmarking AnTuTu apps, have been banned from the Google Play Store.

Cheetah Mobile's web browser mobile app, CM Browser, was banned in India on 29 June 2020 in the aftermath of the 2020–2021 China–India skirmishes.
