= Cubot =

Chinese smartphone brand

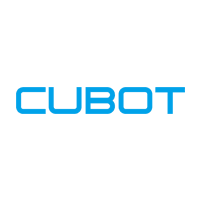
- Native name: 深圳华福瑞科技有限公司
- Romanized name: Shēnzhèn Huáfùruì Kējì Yǒuxiàn Gōngsī
- Type: Private
- Genre: Consumer electronics
- Founded: 2012
- Headquarters: Shenzhen, China
- Area served: China

Cubot, (酷百特) also known as Shenzhen Huafurui Technology Co. Ltd., is a brand of Android smartphones manufactured in China. The company is based in Shenzhen and was founded in 2012.

== Products ==
=== Hardware ===
Cubot smartphones are equipped with a range of processors, including MediaTek, UNISOC, and Qualcomm Snapdragon. All of these processors employ the ARM architecture family optimize performance.

Additionally, these devices run stock Android, coming without any additional graphical user interfaces or pre-installed bloatware to ensure a basic and easy-to-use user experience.

=== Smartphones series ===
- C, R, P: low-end market.
- KingKong, Quest: rugged smartphones.
- Note: wide screen.
- Power (formerly H): large battery.
- J, R, Rainbow, GT: very low-end market.
- P: below the X series.
- X: Cubot's most expensive smartphones in Japan.
- Hafury: Fashion

=== Models released ===
Previous and current models include:

==== 2013 ====
- T9
- A890
- A6589S
- GT99
- C10+
- C9+
- C9W
- GT72
- C7+
- P9
- C6
- P5
- GT90
- Bobby
- C11
- One
- P6

==== 2014 ====
- X6
- S208
- S222
- S308
- S108
- P7
- GT88
- GT95
- P10
- S168
- Zorro 001
- S200
- X9

==== 2015 ====
- S350
- X10
- X11
- X12
- X15
- H1
- P11
- X16
- X17
- P12
- S600
- Note S

==== 2016 ====
- S550
- S550 Pro
- Z100
- CheetahPhone
- S500
- H2
- X17 S
- Dinosaur
- Rainbow
- X16 S
- Max
- Echo
- Z100 Pro
- Manito
- Cheetah 2

==== 2017 ====
- Rainbow 2
- R9
- Magic
- Note Plus
- X18
- H3
- King Kong

==== 2018 ====
- R11
- X18 Plus
- J3
- J3 Pro
- Nova
- Power
- P20
- A5
- King Kong 3

==== 2019 ====
- Quest
- Quest Lite
- X19
- J5
- R15
- MAX 2
- J7
- X20
- X20 Pro
- P30
- R15 Pro
- R19
- Note 20
- KingKong Mini

==== 2020 ====
- J8
- J9
- C20
- C30
- P30
- P40
- Note 7
- Note 20
- Note 20 Pro
- X30
- Kingkong 2
- Kingkong CS
- Quest Lite
- X19
- X19 S
- X20
- X20 Pro
- X30

==== 2021 ====
- X50
- Note 20 pro
- Max 3
- J10
- Kingkong 6 Pro

==== 2022 ====
- Pocket
- Pocket 3
- J20
- P50
- P60
- Note 8
- Note 9
- Note 30
- Kingkong Mini 2 Pro
- Kingkong Mini 3
- Kingkong 5
- Kingkong 6
- Kingkong 7

==== 2023 ====
- P80
- X70
- C20 Pro (smartwatch)
- C21 (smartwatch)
- Kingkong 8
- Kingkong 9
- Kingkong Power
- Note 50
- Kingkong Star
- Note 21
- Note 40

==== 2024 ====
- X90
- KingKong X 5g
- KingKong X Pro 5g
- KingKong Power 3
- KingKong Star 2 5g
- A1
- A10
- MAX 5 5g
- KingKong ES
- KingKong Ace 2
- KingKong Ace 3
- A20
- Tab King Kong
- Tab 50 (tablet)
- Tab 60 (tablet)
- A30
- KingKong AX
- Hafury meet
- Hafury V1
- X1 (smartwatch)
- C29(smartwatch)
- C28(smartwatch)

==== 2025 ====
- Tab 70 (Tablet)
- U1 (Smartwatch)
- X3 (Smartwatch)
- GT3 (Smartwatch)
- Tab 65 (Tablet)
- KingKong Power 5
- P90
- A40
- KingKong ES 3
- KingKong 11
- X100
- KingKong Mini 4
- Tab KingKong Mini
- Tab KingKong S
- Note 60
- KingKong Ace 5

==== 2026 ====
- Beatbox (Smartwatch)
- GT5 (Smartwatch)
- KingKong ES5
- KingKong Dura
- KingKong ES Pro
- A50

==== Cheetah Phone ====
In February 2016, Cubot and Cheetah Mobile launched the CheetahPhone, an Android 6.0 Marshmallow based smartphone, at MWC in Barcelona, Spain.

In 2016, Cubot and Kilimall launched the Cubot Note S, which includes an eight megapixel primary camera. The secondary camera is five megapixels. The 5.5" scratch resistant screen comes with an extra layer of security in the form of a protector. It has a high definition resolution of 720p. The device has a mono speaker and a 3.5mm jack. The device has 16 gigabytes of internal storage, expandable to 64 gigabytes with a Micro SD card.
