= Evolveo =

Czech consumer electronics brand

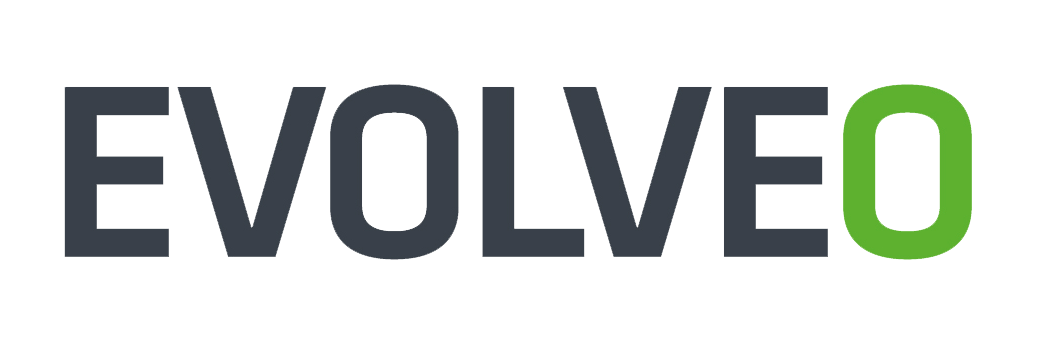
- Type: Společnost s ručením omezeným
- Founded: 2005
- Headquarters: České Budějovice, Czech Republic
- Owner: Abacus Electric
- Website: eshop.evolveo.com

Evolveo is a Czech consumer electronics brand established in 2005. It is owned by Abacus Electric company based in České Budějovice, which has been a distributor in the field of information technology since 1992. At first, it operated only in Central Europe. Until 2013, it was named Evolve, and after entering English-speaking countries, it was renamed Evolveo.

== Operations ==
The Abacus Electric company deals with the distribution of computer components, it is the largest distributor of computer cases in the Czech Republic and the largest Czech manufacturer of servers. Under its Evolveo brand, various consumer electronics products are manufactured. The brand's main products include rugged mobile phones, Smartwatches, fitness trackers, computer cases, keyboards, mice, Wireless speakers, headphones, Robotic vacuum cleaners, set-top boxes, antennas and other electrical material. The brand operates in more than ten countries.
