= Cat S50 =

Mobile phone from Caterpillar Inc.

The Cat S50 is a mobile phone introduced in November 2014 by Caterpillar Inc. It runs Android 4.4 KitKat.

It was succeeded by the Cat S60.
