= Bullitt Group =

British multinational mobile phone and consumer electronics manufacturing company

Bullitt Group Ltd
- Bullitt Group Ltd logo
- Type: Private limited company (Ltd)
- Industry: Electronics design; Electronics manufacture; Telecommunications
- Founded: 1 June 2009; 17 years ago
- Founders: Colin Batt (co-founder, director); David Floyd (co-founder, director); Richard Wharton (co-founder, director)
- Defunct: 2024
- Headquarters: Reading, Berkshire, England, United Kingdom
- Area served: Worldwide
- Products: Mobile phones, rugged smartphones, consumer electronics
- Brands: CAT Phones; CAT Mobile Accessories; Motorola Phones; Land Rover Phones
- Revenue: ▲UK£61.3 million (2014); ▲UK£30 million (2013); ▲UK£10 million (2012)
- Website: Bullitt-Group.com

Bullitt Group Ltd was a British-based international mobile phone and consumer electronics business. Founded in 2009 by Colin Batt, David Floyd and Richard Wharton; Bullitt designed, manufactured, marketed, and sold consumer electronic devices in partnership with global brands. It was the worldwide licensee of Caterpillar Inc. for 'rugged' mobile devices and accessories, and Motorola for outdoor-orientated consumer electronics.

Bullitt's products were sold in more than 75 countries, and the company had a presence in key markets around the world, including China (Shenzhen), the United Kingdom (Reading), and the United States of America (New York). Manufacturing was primarily in China.

== Growth and development ==
Founded in the United Kingdom (UK) in 2009, Bullitt Group Ltd opened international operations in China in 2010, and in the USA in 2012. Bullitt's first licence was with JCB mobile devices, and in February 2012, the company became the worldwide licensee of Caterpillar Inc. for mobile devices and accessories. Licences for Ted Baker (high quality, design-led audio devices), and Kodak (easy to use smartphones) soon followed, in 2014 respectively. Most recently, Bullitt Group Ltd became a global licensee for the Ministry of Sound to develop a range of headphones and connected audio devices that was to launch in May 2015. Around May 2016, it partnered with Bullitt Group Lltd to launch a portfolio of mobile devices and peripherals.

In May 2016, Bullitt announced a partnership with Land Rover which will bring about the development of a new portfolio of mobile devices and peripherals.

In February 2021, Motorola partnered with Bullitt Group to develop Moto-branded rugged phones which will be drop-proof and shock-proof.

In January 2024, the company shut down after a failed critical planned restructuring.

== See also ==
- TUFF Phones
