= IEEE 1613 =

IEEE standard for communications networking devices in electric power substations

Substation near Denver International Airport

IEEE-1613 is the IEEE standard detailing environmental and testing requirements for communications networking devices in electric power substations. The standard is sponsored by the IEEE Power & Energy Society.
