= Cat B25 =

Mobile phone licensed from Caterpillar, Inc.

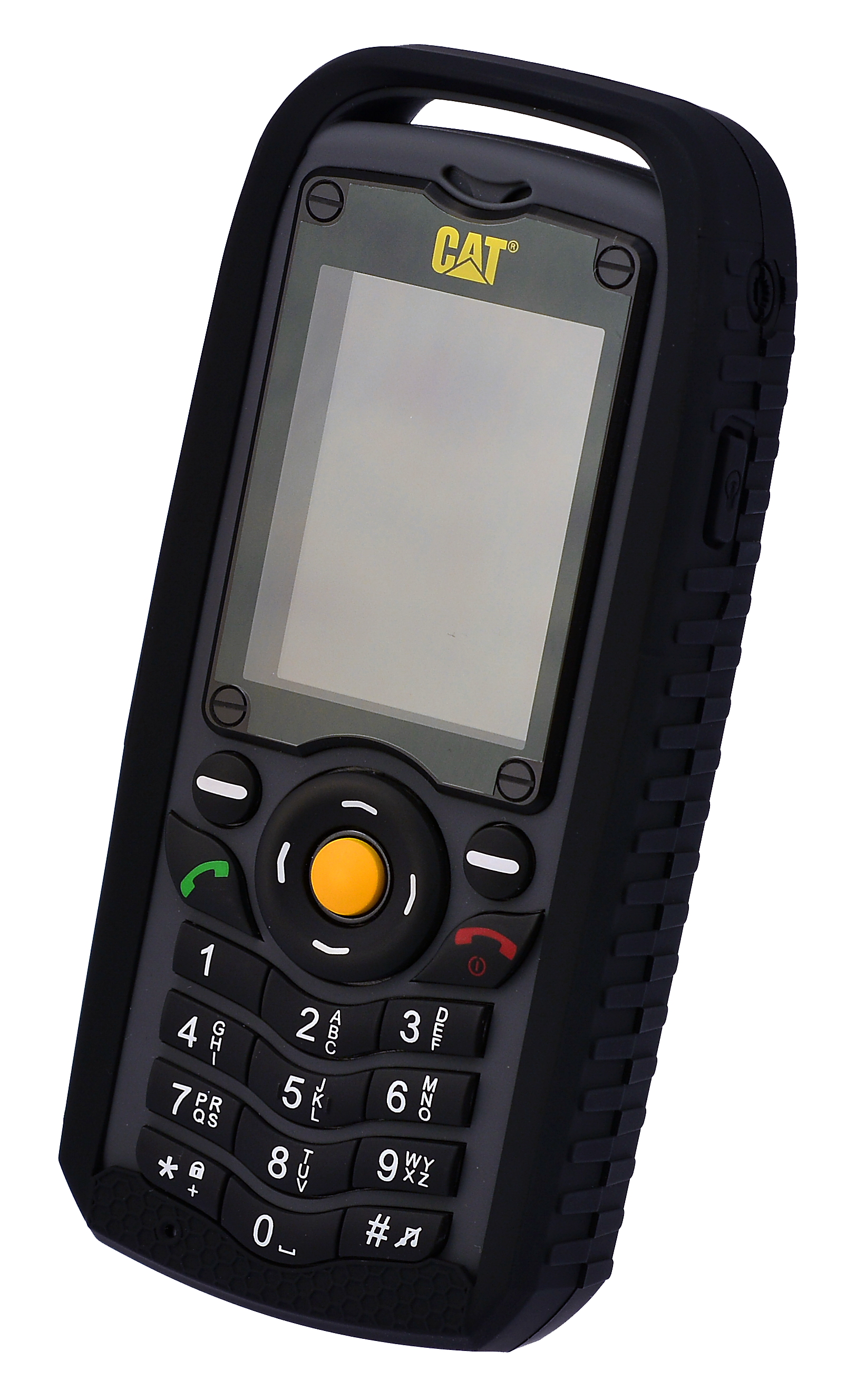
- The CAT B25.
- Manufacturer: Bullitt Group
- Type: Feature phone
- Series: Cat phones
- First released: 2013; 13 years ago
- Compatible networks: GSM/GPRS/EDGE GSM (850, 900, 1800, and 1900 MHz)
- System-on-chip: MediaTek MT6260A
- Removable storage: microSD, up to 8 GB (dedicated slot)
- Battery: 1,300 mAh; Removable Li-Ion rechargeable Li-ion
- Rear camera: 1,92 megapixel auto focus LED flash
- Display: 240x320 pixels px, 200 ppi 2 in (5.1 cm) diagonal, TFT LCD panel
- Connectivity: Micro USB 2.0; Bluetooth 2.1
- Data inputs: Microphone; Keypad
- Other: FM Radio; Drop-to-concrete resistance up to 1.8 m IP67 dust/water resistant up to 1m for 30 mins

The Cat B25 is a mobile phone introduced in 2013 created by Bullitt Group with the license from Caterpillar Inc. as the first phone in the Cat phones line. The objective of the phone is to be a rugged and resilient option to be used with minimal damage.

It is a slight redesign of the JCB Sitemaster 2, another phone by Bullitt released in 2012 for their former licensee JCB, changing the color from yellow to grey, and modifying the rubber grip around the phone to the appearance to a continuous track.
