= MWfly B25 =

B25
- Type: Aircraft engine
- National origin: Italy
- Manufacturer: MWfly srl
- Developed from: MWfly B22

The MWfly B25 is a family of Italian aircraft engines, designed and produced by MWfly of Passirana di Rho for use in light aircraft.

== Design and development ==
The B25 series are all four-cylinder four-stroke, horizontally-opposed, 2,500 cc (152.6 cu in) displacement, liquid-cooled, gasoline engine designs. They all employ dual electronic ignition systems and have a compression ratio of 10.5:1.

== Variants ==
B25D
Direct drive model with an output of 115 hp (86 kW) at 3300 rpm or 155 hp (116 kW) at 4700 rpm.
B25G
Geared model with a mechanical gearbox reduction drive with a reduction ratio of 1.731:1 or 1.958:1 and an output of 140 hp (104 kW) at 4000 rpm or 155 hp (116 kW) at 4700 rpm, respectively.
B25R
Model with a helical gear mechanical gearbox reduction drive with a reduction ratio of 1.731:1 and an output of 150 hp (112 kW) at 4550 rpm. By March 2018 the engine was no longer advertised on the company website and seems to be out of production.

== Specifications (B25R) ==
Data from Tacke

=== General characteristics ===
- Type: Four cylinder, four stroke aircraft engine
- Bore: 100 mm (3.9 in)
- Stroke: 81 mm (3.2 in)
- Displacement: 2,500 cc (152.6 cu in)
- Length: 640 mm (25.2 in)
- Width: 758 mm (29.8 in)
- Height: 427 mm (16.8 in)
- Dry weight: 79 kg (174.2 lb)

=== Components ===
- Fuel type: gasoline
- Cooling system: liquid
- Reduction gear: helical gear mechanical reduction drive

=== Performance ===
- Power output: 95 hp (71 kW)
- Compression ratio: 10.5:1

== See also ==
Related lists

- List of aircraft engines
