= MWfly B22 =

B22
- Type: Aircraft engine
- National origin: Italy
- Manufacturer: MWfly srl
- Variants: MWfly B25

The MWfly B22 is a family of Italian aircraft engines, designed and produced by MWfly of Passirana di Rho for use in light aircraft.

== Design and development ==
The B22 series are all four-cylinder four-stroke, horizontally-opposed, 2,203 cc (134.4 cu in) displacement, liquid-cooled, gasoline engine designs. They all employ single electronic ignition systems and have a compression ratio of 10.4:1.

== Variants ==
B22D
Direct drive model with an output of 95 hp (71 kW) at 3300 rpm or 100 hp (75 kW) at 3500 rpm, or 135 hp (101 kW) at 4700 rpm.
B22G
Geared model with a mechanical gearbox reduction drive with a reduction ratio of 1.731:1 or 1.958:1 and an output of 122 hp (91 kW) at 4000 rpm, or 135 hp (101 kW) at 4700 rpm, respectively.
B22L
Model with a mechanical gearbox reduction drive with a reduction ratio of 1.73:1 and an output of 115 hp (86 kW) at 3950 rpm. By March 2018 the engine was no longer advertised on the company website and seems to be out of production.
B22R
Model with a mechanical gearbox reduction drive with a reduction ratio of 2.14:1 and an output of 130 hp (97 kW) at 4700 rpm. By March 2018 the engine was no longer advertised on the company website and seems to be out of production.

== Specifications (B22D) ==
Data from Tacke

=== General characteristics ===
- Type: Four cylinder, four stroke aircraft engine
- Bore: 93 mm (3.7 in)
- Stroke: 81 mm (3.2 in)
- Displacement: 2,203 cc (134.4 cu in)
- Length: 629 mm (24.8 in)
- Width: 758 mm (29.8 in)
- Height: 427 mm (16.8 in)
- Dry weight: 75 kg (165.3 lb)

=== Components ===
- Fuel type: gasoline
- Cooling system: liquid
- Reduction gear: none

=== Performance ===
- Power output: 95 hp (71 kW)
- Compression ratio: 10.4:1

== See also ==
Related lists

- List of aircraft engines
