= EN 62262 =

European impact protection standard

The European Standard EN 62262 — the equivalent of international standard IEC 62262 (2002) — relates to IK (impact protection) ratings. This is an international numeric classification for the degrees of protection provided by enclosures for electrical equipment against external mechanical impacts. It provides a means of specifying the capacity of an enclosure to protect its contents from external impacts. The IK Code was originally defined in European Standard BS EN 50102 (1995, amended 1998). Following its adoption as an international standard in 2002, the European standard was renumbered EN 62262.

Before the advent of the IK code, a third numeral had been occasionally added to the closely related IP Code on ingress protection, to indicate the level of impact protection — e.g. IP66(9). Nonstandard use of this system was one of the factors leading to the development of this standard, which uses a separate two numeral code to distinguish it from the old differing systems. The standard came into effect in October 1995 and conflicting national standards had to be withdrawn by April 1997.

IK ratings help to classify products by its resistance to impacts by kinetic energy, while EN 62262 specifies the way enclosures should be mounted when tests are carried out, the atmospheric conditions that should prevail, the number of impacts (5) and their (even) distribution, and the size, style, material, dimensions etc. of the various types of hammer designed to produce the energy levels required.

In 2021 an additional IK code 11 representing the impact energy value of 50 joules was added.

IK code and impact energy (values changed in Amd 1:2021)
| IK code | IK00 | IK01 | IK02 | IK03 | IK04 | IK05 | IK06 | IK07 | IK08 | IK09 | IK10 | IK11 |
|---|---|---|---|---|---|---|---|---|---|---|---|---|
| Impact energy (joule) | * | 0.14 | 0.2 | 0.35 | 0.5 | 0.7 | 1 | 2 | 5 | 10 | 20 | 50 |

Impact test characteristics
| IK code | IK00 | IK01 to IK05 | IK06 | IK07 | IK08 | IK09 | IK10 | IK11 |
|---|---|---|---|---|---|---|---|---|
| Impact energy (joules) | * | <1 | 1 | 2 | 5 | 10 | 20 | 50 |
| R mm (radius of striking element) | * | 10 | 10 | 25 | 25 | 50 | 50 | 50 |
| Material | * | polyamide^{1} | polyamide^{1} | steel^{2} | steel^{2} | steel^{2} | steel^{2} | steel^{2} |
| Mass kg | * | 0.2 | 0.5 | 0.5 | 1.7 | 5 | 5 | 10 |
| Free fall height m | * | * | * | 0.40 | 0.30 | 0.20 | 0.40 | 0.50 |
| Pendulum hammer | * | Yes | Yes | Yes | Yes | Yes | Yes | No |
| Spring hammer | * | Yes | Yes | Yes | No | No | No | No |
| Free fall hammer | * | No | No | Yes | Yes | Yes | Yes | Yes |

* not protected according to the standard

1. HR 100 Rockwell hardness according to ISO 2039/2
2. Fe 490-2 according to ISO 1052, Rockwell hardness HR 50 to HR 58 according to ISO 6508
