= MIL-STD-810 =

Military standard

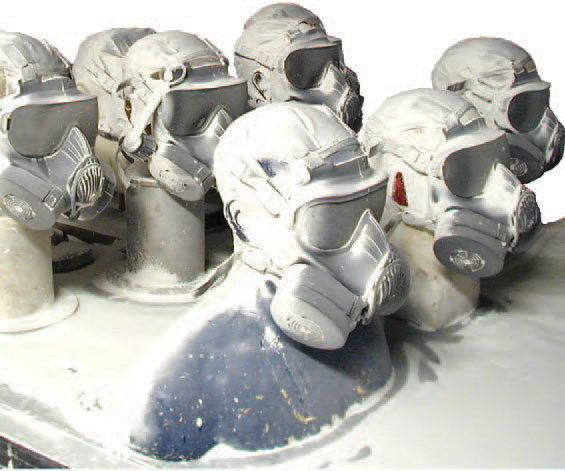
Protective military gear is subjected to stressing environmental and climatic conditions using the laboratory test methods of Military Standard 810F Test Standards.

MIL-STD-810, U.S. Department of Defense Test Method Standard, Environmental Engineering Considerations and Laboratory Tests, is a United States Military Standard that specifies environmental tests to determine whether equipment is suitably designed to survive the conditions that it would experience throughout its service life. The standard establishes chamber test methods that replicate the effects of environments on the equipment rather than imitating the environments themselves. Although prepared specifically for U.S. military applications, the standard is often applied for commercial products as well.

The standard's guidance and test methods are intended to:

- define environmental stress sequences, durations, and levels of equipment life cycles;
- be used to develop analysis and test criteria tailored to the equipment and its environmental life cycle;
- evaluate equipment's performance when exposed to a life cycle of environmental stresses
- identify deficiencies, shortcomings, and defects in equipment design, materials, manufacturing processes, packaging techniques, and maintenance methods; and
- demonstrate compliance with contractual requirements.

MIL-STD-810G was replaced by MIL-STD-810H in 2019. In 2022, MIL-STD-810H Change Notice 1 was released. As of 2024, the latest version is MIL-STD-810H with Change Notice 1.

== Cognizant agency ==
MIL-STD-810 is maintained by a Tri-Service partnership that includes the United States Air Force, Army, and Navy. The U.S. Army Test and Evaluation Command, or ATEC, serves as Lead Standardization Activity / Preparing Activity, and is chartered under the Defense Standardization Program (DSP) with maintaining the functional expertise and serving as the DoD-wide technical focal point for the standard. The Institute of Environmental Sciences and Technology is the Administrator for WG-DTE043: MIL-STD-810, the Working Group tasked with reviewing the current environmental testing guidance and recommending improvements to the DOD Tri-Service Working Group.

== Scope and purpose ==
MIL-STD-810 addresses a broad range of environmental conditions that include: low pressure for altitude testing; exposure to high and low temperatures plus temperature shock (both operating and in storage); rain (including wind blown and freezing rain); humidity, fungus, salt fog for corrosion testing; sand and dust exposure; explosive atmosphere; leakage; acceleration; shock and transport shock; gunfire vibration; and random vibration. The standard describes environmental management and engineering processes that can be of enormous value to generate confidence in the environmental worthiness and overall durability of a system design. The standard contains military acquisition program planning and engineering direction to consider the influences that environmental stresses have on equipment throughout all phases of its service life. The document does not impose design or test specifications. Rather, it describes the environmental conditioning process that results in realistic material designs and test methods based on material system performance requirements.

Finally, there are limitations inherent in laboratory testing that make it imperative to use proper engineering judgment to extrapolate laboratory results to results that may be obtained under actual service conditions. In many cases, real-world environmental stresses (singularly or in combination) cannot be duplicated in test laboratories. Therefore, users should not assume that an item that passes laboratory testing also will pass field/fleet verification tests.

== History and evolution ==
In 1945, the Army Air Force (AAF) released the first specification providing a formal methodology for testing equipment under simulated environmental conditions. That document, entitled AAF Specification 41065, Equipment: General Specification for Environmental Test of, is the direct ancestor of MIL-STD-810. In 1965, the USAF released a technical report with data and information on the origination and development of natural and induced environmental tests intended for aerospace and ground equipment. By using that document, the design engineer obtained a clearer understanding of the interpretation, application, and relationship of environmental testing to military equipment and material.

The Institute of Environmental Sciences and Technology (IEST), a non-profit technical society, released the publication History and Rationale of MIL-STD-810 to capture the thought process behind the evolution of MIL-STD-810. It also provides a development history of test methods, rationale for many procedural changes, tailoring guidance for many test procedures, and insight into the future direction of the standard.

The MIL-STD-810 test series originally addressed generic laboratory environmental testing. The first edition of MIL-STD-810 in 1962 included only a single sentence allowing users to modify tests to reflect environmental conditions. Subsequent editions contained essentially the same phrase, but did not elaborate on the subject until MIL-STD-810D was issued marking one of the more significant revisions of the standard with its focus more on shock and vibration tests that closely mirrored real-world operating environments. MIL-STD-810F further defined test methods while continuing the concept of creating test chambers that simulate conditions likely to be encountered during a product's useful life rather than simply replicating the actual environments. More recently, MIL-STD-810G implements Test Method 527 calling for the use of multiple vibration exciters to perform multi-axis shaking that simultaneously excites all test article resonances and simulates real-world vibrations. This approach replaces the legacy approach of three distinct tests, that is, shaking a load first in its x axis, then its y axis, and finally in its z axis.

A matrix of the tests and methods of MIL-STD-810 through Revision G is available on the web and quite useful in comparing the changes among the various revisions .

The following table traces the specification's evolution in terms of environmental tailoring to meet a specific user's needs.

Version of MIL-STD-810	Date	Focus on Environmental Considerations
MIL-STD-810	14 June 1962	One sentence under "Purpose" states that the laboratory test methods serve as a guide to those who prepare environmental portions of detail specifications. One sentence on tailoring.
MIL-STD-810A	23 June 1964	Same as MIL-STD-810.
MIL-STD-810B	15 June 1967	One sentence under "Purpose/Scope" states that the standard establishes methods for determining the resistance of equipment to the effects of natural and induced environments peculiar to military operations. One sentence on tailoring.
MIL-STD-810C	3 October 1975	Same as MIL-STD-810B
MIL-STD-810D	19 July 1983	A section on tailoring explains how to consider environmental issues throughout the material development process. Includes diagrams on the environmental tailoring process and on environmental life cycle histories of various classes of military hardware.
MIL-STD-810E	14 July 1989	Same as 810D with addition of a flow diagram, "How to Use MIL-STD-810E", that shows how Data Item Descriptions relate to each other in the acquisition process and who is responsible for preparing them.
MIL-STD-810F	1 January 2000	New 54-page "Part One" explains how to implement the environmental tailoring process throughout the material acquisition cycle, focusing separately on the roles of the different users. Includes Environmental Engineering Program Guide. The guidance goes beyond laboratory testing to encompass natural environment field/fleet testing. Alternatives to testing hardware prototypes (e.g., modelling and simulation) are recognized as standard environmental engineering test practices.
MIL-STD-810G	31 October 2008	
MIL-STD-810H	31 January 2019	

== Part one – General program guidelines ==
Part One of MIL-STD-810 describes management, engineering, and technical roles in the environmental design and test tailoring process. It focuses on the process of tailoring design and test criteria to the specific environmental conditions an equipment item is likely to encounter during its service life. New appendices support the succinctly presented text of Part One. It describes the tailoring process (i.e., systematically considering detrimental effects that various environmental factors may have on a specific equipment throughout its service life) and applies this process throughout the equipment's life cycle to meet user and interoperability needs.

== Part two – Laboratory test methods ==
Part Two of MIL-STD-810 contains the environmental laboratory test methods to be applied using the test tailoring guidelines described in Part One of the document. With the exception of Test Method 528, these methods are not mandatory, but rather the appropriate method is selected and tailored to generate the most relevant test data possible. Each test method in Part Two contains some environmental data and references, and it identifies particular tailoring opportunities. Each test method supports the test engineer by describing preferred laboratory test facilities and methodologies. These environmental management and engineering processes can be of enormous value to generate confidence in the environmental worthiness and overall durability of equipment and material. Still, the user must recognize that there are limitations inherent in laboratory testing that make it imperative to use engineering judgment when extrapolating from laboratory results to results that may be obtained under actual service conditions. In many cases, real-world environmental stresses (singularly or in combination) cannot be duplicated practically or reliably in test laboratories. Therefore, users should not assume that a system or component that passes laboratory tests of this standard also would pass field/fleet verification trials.

Updated Test Methods and Procedures in MIL-STD-810H are listed below:

- Test Method 500.6 Low Pressure (Altitude)
  - Procedure I - Storage/Air Transport: Procedure I is appropriate if the material is to be transported or stored at high ground elevations or transported by air in its shipping/storage configuration.
  - Procedure II - Operation/Air Carriage: Use Procedure II to determine the performance of the material under low pressure conditions.
  - Procedure III - Rapid Decompression: Use Procedure III to determine if a rapid decrease in pressure of the surrounding environment will cause a material reaction that would endanger nearby personnel or the platform (ground vehicle or aircraft) in which it is being transported.
- Test Method 501.7 High Temperature
  - Procedure I - Storage: Use Procedure I to investigate how high temperatures during storage affect the material (integrity of materials, and safety/performance of the material).
  - Procedure II - Operation: Use Procedure II to investigate how high ambient temperatures may affect material performance while it is operating.
  - Procedure III - Tactical-Standby to Operational: This procedure evaluates the material’s performance at the operating temperatures after being presoaked at non-operational temperatures.
- Test Method 502.7 Low Temperature
  - Procedure I - Storage: Use Procedure I to investigate how low temperatures during storage affect material safety during and after storage, and performance after storage.
  - Procedure II - Operation: Use Procedure II to investigate how well the material operates in low temperature environments.
  - Procedure III - Manipulation: Use Procedure III to investigate the ease with which the material can be set up or assembled, operated, and disassembled by personnel wearing heavy, cold-weather clothing.
- Test Method 503.7 Temperature Shock
  - Procedure I-A: One-way Shock(s) from Constant Extreme Temperature.
  - Procedure I-B: Single Cycle Shock from Constant Extreme Temperature.
  - Procedure I-C: Multi-Cycle Shocks from Constant Extreme Temperature.
  - Procedure I-D: Shocks To or From Controlled Ambient Temperature.
- Test Method 504.3 Contamination by Fluids
- Test Method 505.7 Solar Radiation (Sunshine)
  - Procedure I – Cycling: Use Procedure I to investigate response temperatures when material is exposed in the open in realistically hot climates, and is expected to perform without degradation during and after exposure.
  - Procedure II – Steady State: Use Procedure II to investigate the effects on material of long periods of exposure to sunshine.
- Test Method 506.6 Rain
  - Procedure I - Rain and Blowing Rain: Procedure I is applicable for material that will be deployed out-of-doors and that will be unprotected from rain or blowing rain.
  - Procedure II - Exaggerated: Consider Procedure II when large (shelter-size) material is to be tested and a blowing-rain facility is not available or practical.
  - Procedure III - Drip: Procedure III is appropriate when material is normally protected from rain but may be exposed to falling water from condensation or leakage from upper surfaces.
- Test Method 507.6 Humidity
  - Procedure I – Induced (Storage and Transit) and Natural Cycles: Once a cycle is selected, perform the storage and transit portion first, followed by the corresponding natural environment portion of the cycle.
  - Procedure II – Aggravated: Procedure II exposes the test item to more extreme temperature and humidity levels than those found in nature (without contributing degrading elements), but for shorter durations.
- Test Method 508.8 Fungus
- Test Method 509.7 Salt Fog

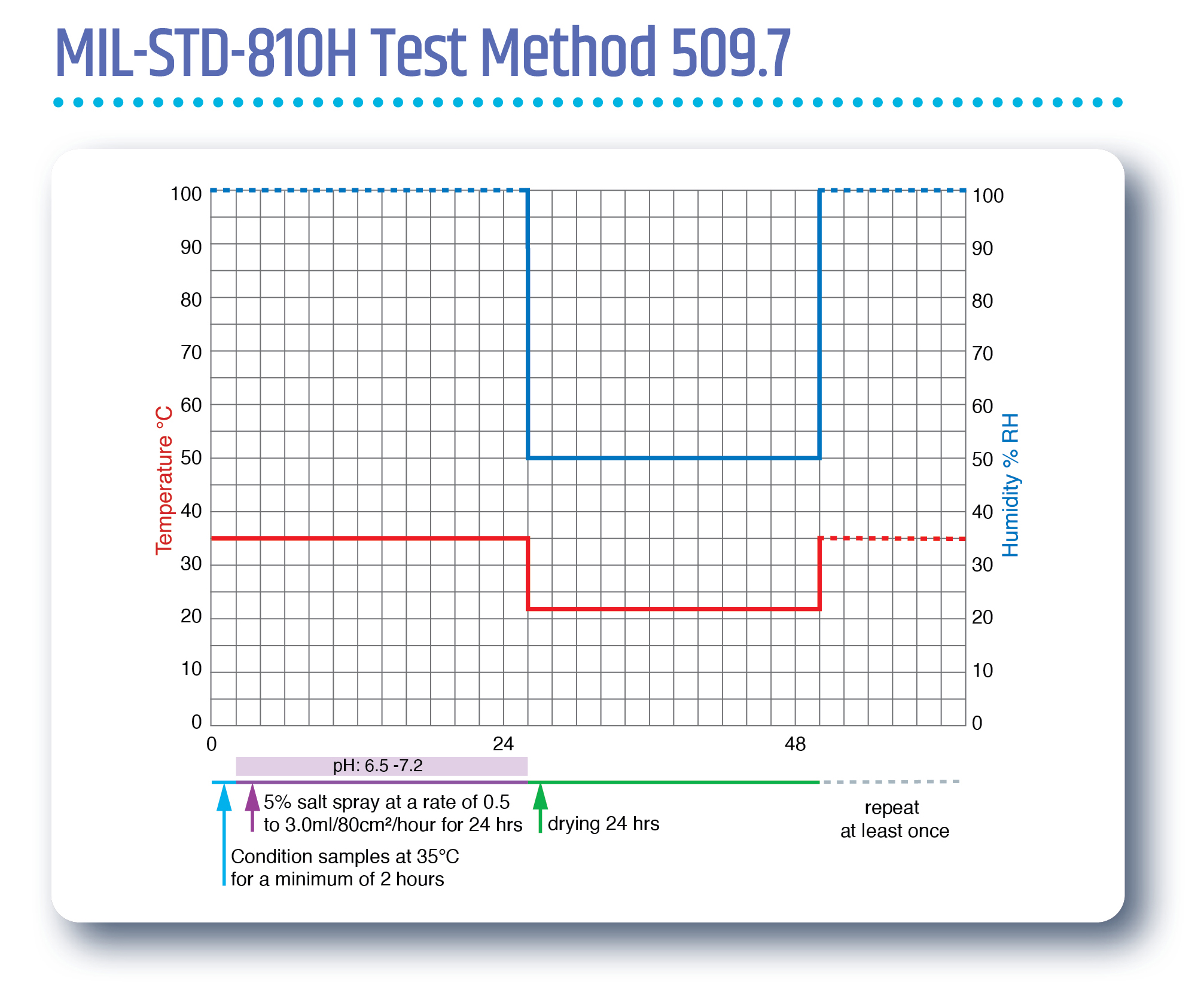

Test specimens are placed in an enclosed chamber and exposed to a continuous indirect spray of neutral (pH 6.5 to 7.2) salt water solution, which falls-out on to the specimens at a rate of 0.5 to 3.0ml/80cm²/hour, in a chamber temperature of +35°C. This climate is generally maintained under constant steady state conditions, but may also be cycled between salt spray for 24 hours and ambient air drying for 24 hours. The test duration is variable.

- Test Method 510.7 Sand and Dust
  - Procedure I - Blowing Dust: Use Procedure I to investigate the susceptibility of material to concentrations of blowing dust (<150 μm).
  - Procedure II - Blowing Sand: Use Procedure II to investigate the susceptibility of material to the effects of blowing sand (150 μm to 850 μm).
- Test Method 511.7 Explosive Atmosphere
  - Procedure I - Explosive Atmosphere: This procedure is applicable to all types of sealed and unsealed material. This test evaluates the ability of the test item to be operated in a fuel vapor environment without igniting the environment.
  - Procedure II - Explosion Containment: This procedure is used to determine the ability of the test item's case or other enclosures to contain an explosion or flame that is a result of an internal material malfunction.
- Test Method 512.6 Immersion
- Test Method 513.8 Acceleration
  - Procedure I - Structural Test: Procedure I is used to d°emonstrate that material will structurally withstand the loads induced by in-service accelerations.
  - Procedure II - Operational Test: Procedure II is used to demonstrate that material will operate without degradation during and after being subjected to loads induced by in-service acceleration.
  - Procedure III - Crash Hazard Acceleration Test: Procedure III is used to disclose structural failures of material that may present a hazard to personnel during or after a crash.
  - Procedure IV – Strength Test: Procedure IV is a strength test primarily intended to generate specific loads in primary structures using sine burst testing
- Test Method 514.8 Vibration

Governs the simulation of vibration environments encountered by materiel during lifecycle phases, utilizing complex laboratory profiles such as random, sine-on-random, and helicopter scrambled vibration. In practical laboratory compliance, executing Method 514 profiles requires precise engineering calculation of dynamic force ratings (F = m · a), velocity limits, and displacement bounds of the electrodynamic shaker system. Selecting the appropriate continuous and peak force capacity is critical, as severe impedance mismatches between the heavy fixture/payload and the armature can cause nonlinear harmonic distortion and premature testing aborts. For laboratory implementation, detailed metrological frameworks dictate how to evaluate systemic constraints—including amplifier power margins, G_{rms} capability, and multi-axis coupling—to ensure stable, non-deviant replication of MIL-STD-810 stress matrices.

  - Procedure I - General Vibration: Use Procedure I for material to be transported as secured cargo or deployed for use on a vehicle.
  - Procedure II - Loose Cargo Transportation: Use this procedure for material to be carried in/on trucks, trailers, or tracked vehicles and not secured to (tied down in) the carrying vehicle.
  - Procedure III - Large Assembly Transportation: This procedure is intended to replicate the vibration and shock environment incurred by large assemblies of material installed or transported by wheeled or tracked vehicles.
  - Procedure IV - Assembled Aircraft Store Captive Carriage and Free Flight: Apply Procedure IV to fixed wing aircraft carriage and free flight portions of the environmental life cycles of all aircraft stores, and to the free flight phases of ground or sea-launched missiles.
- Test Method 515.8 Acoustic Noise
  - Procedure I-a - Uniform Intensity Acoustic Noise: Procedure Ia has a uniform intensity shaped spectrum of acoustic noise that impacts all the exposed material surfaces.
  - Procedure I-b - Direct Field Acoustic Noise (DFAN): Procedure Ib uses normal incident plane waves in a shaped spectrum of acoustic noise to impact directly on all exposed test article surfaces without external boundary reflections.
  - Procedure II - Grazing Incidence Acoustic Noise: Procedure II includes a high intensity, rapidly fluctuating acoustic noise with a shaped spectrum that impacts the material surfaces in a particular direction - generally along the long dimension of the material.
  - Procedure III - Cavity Resonance Acoustic Noise: In Procedure III, the intensity and, to a great extent, the frequency content of the acoustic noise spectrum is governed by the relationship between the geometrical configuration of the cavity and the material within the cavity.
- Test Method 516.8 Shock
  - Procedure I - Functional Shock: Procedure I is intended to test material (including mechanical, electrical, hydraulic, and electronic) in its functional mode, and to assess the physical integrity, continuity, and functionality of the material to shock.
  - Procedure II - Transportation Shock: Procedure II is used to evaluate the response of an item or restraint system to transportation environments that create a repetitive shock load.
  - Procedure III - Fragility: Procedure III is used early in the item development program to determine the material's fragility level, in order that packaging, storage, or mounting configurations may be designed to protect the material's physical and functional integrity.
  - Procedure IV - Transit Drop: Procedure IV is a physical drop test, and is intended for material either outside of, or within its transit or combination case, or as prepared for field use (carried to a combat situation by man, truck, rail, etc.).
  - Procedure V - Crash Hazard Shock Test: Procedure V is for material mounted in air or ground vehicles that could break loose from its mounts, tiedowns, or containment configuration during a crash, and present a hazard to vehicle occupants and bystanders.
  - Procedure VI - Bench Handling: Procedure VI is intended for material that may typically experience bench handling, bench maintenance, or packaging.
  - Procedure VII – Pendulum Impact: Procedure VII is intended to test the ability of large shipping containers to resist horizontal impacts, and to determine the ability of the packaging and packing methods to provide protection to the contents when the container is impacted.
  - Procedure VIII - Catapult Launch/Arrested Landing: Procedure VIII is intended for material mounted in or on fixed-wing aircraft that is subject to catapult launches and arrested landings.
- Test Method 517.3 Pyroshock
  - Procedure I - Near-field with Actual Configuration: Procedure I is intended to test material in its functional mode and actual configuration (material/pyrotechnic device physical configuration), and to ensure it can survive and function as required when tested using the actual pyrotechnic test device in its intended installed configuration.
  - Procedure II - Near-field with Simulated Configuration: Procedure II is intended to test material in its functional mode, but with a simulated structural configuration, and to ensure it can survive and function as required when in its actual material/pyrotechnic device physical configuration.
  - Procedure III - Mid-field with a Mechanical Test Device: Pyroshock can be applied using conventional high acceleration amplitude/frequency test input devices between 3,000 and 10,000 Hz.
  - Procedure IV - Far-field Using a Mechanical Test Device: Pyroshock can be applied using conventional high acceleration amplitude/frequency test input devices frequencies less than 3,000 Hz.
  - Procedure V - Far-field Using an Electrodynamic Shaker: On occasion, pyroshock response can be replicated using conventional electrodynamic shakers.
- Test Method 518.2 Acidic Atmosphere
- Test Method 519.8 Gunfire Shock
  - Procedure I. Measured material Input/Response Time History Under TWR: Measured in-service gunfire shock environment for material is replicated under laboratory exciter waveform control (Method 525.2 TWR) to achieve a near exact reproduction of the measured in-service gunfire shock environment.
  - Procedure II. SRS Generated Shock Time History Pulse Sequence Under TWR: This procedure is based on former processing measured gunfire shock in terms of the SRS applied either to individual gunfire pulses or the SRS applied to the overall gunfire pulse sequence.
  - Procedure III. Stochastically Generated material Input From Preliminary Design Spectrum Under TWR: This procedure is ad hoc, lacking necessary field measured time trace information, and a last resort to providing guidelines for design of material to resist a gunfire shock environment.
- Test Method 520.5 Combined Environments
- Test Method 521.4 Icing/Freezing Rain
- Test Method 522.2 Ballistic Shock
  - Procedure I - BH&T: Ballistic shock is applied in its natural form using live fire testing.
  - Procedure II - LSBSS: LSBSS is a low cost option for producing the spectrum of ballistic shock without the expense of live fire testing.
  - Procedure III - LWSM: Ballistic shock is simulated using a hammer impact. This procedure is used to test shock mounted components up to 113.6 kg (250 lb), which are known to be insensitive to the higher frequency content of ballistic shock.
  - Procedure IV - Mechanical Shock Simulator: Ballistic shock is simulated using a metal-to-metal impact (gas driven projectile).
  - Procedure V - MWSM: Ballistic shock is simulated using a hammer impact. This procedure is used to test components up to 2,273 kg (5,000 lb) in weight which are known to be insensitive to the higher frequencies of ballistic shock.
  - Procedure VI - Drop Table: Ballistic shock is simulated by the impact resulting from a drop.
- Test Method 523.4 Vibro-Acoustic/Temperature
- Test Method 524.1 Freeze / Thaw
  - Procedure I – Diurnal Cycling Effects: To simulate the effects of diurnal cycling on material exposed to temperatures varying slightly above and below the freeze point that is typical of daytime warming and freezing at night when deposits of ice or condensation, or high relative humidity exist.
  - Procedure II – Fogging: For material transported directly from a cold to a warm environment such as from an unheated aircraft, missile or rocket, to a warm ground area, or from a cold environment to a warm enclosure, and resulting in free water or fogging.
  - Procedure III – Rapid Temperature Change: For material that is to be moved from a warm environment to a cold environment (freeze) and then back to the warm environment, inducing condensation (free water).
- Test Method 525.2 Time Waveform Replication
  - Procedure I: The SESA replication of a field measured material time trace input/response.
  - Procedure II: The SESA replication of an analytically specified material time trace input/response
- Test Method 526.2 Rail Impact.
- Test Method 527.2 Multi-Exciter Test
  - Procedure I – Time Domain Reference Criteria: This MET Procedure is an extension to the SESA TimeWaveform Replication (TWR) techniques addressed in Method 525.2.
  - Procedure II – Frequency Domain Reference Criteria: This MET Procedure is an extension to the SESA Spectral based vibration control techniques addressed in Method 514.8.
- Test Method 528.1 Mechanical Vibrations of Shipboard Equipment (Type I – Environmental and Type II – Internally Excited)

== Part three – World climatic regions ==
Part Three contains a compendium of climatic data and guidance assembled from several sources, including AR 70-38, Research, Development, Test and Evaluation of material for Extreme Climatic Conditions (1979), a draft version of AR 70-38 (1990) that was developed using Air Land Battlefield Environment (ALBE) report information, Environmental Factors and Standards for Atmospheric Obscurants, Climate, and Terrain (1987), and MIL-HDBK-310, Global Climatic Data for Developing Military Products. It also provides planning guidance for realistic consideration (i.e., starting points) of climatic conditions in various regions throughout the world.

== Applicability to "ruggedized" consumer products ==
U.S. MIL-STD-810 is a flexible standard that allows users to tailor test methods to fit the application. As a result, a vendor's claims of "...compliance to U.S. MIL-STD-810..." can be misleading, because no commercial organization or agency certifies compliance, commercial vendors can create the test methods or approaches to fit their product. Suppliers can – and some do – take significant latitude with how they test their products, and how they report the test results. Consumers who require rugged products should verify which test methods that compliance is claimed against and which parameter limits were selected for testing. Also, if some testing was actually done they would have to specify: (i) against which test methods of the standard the compliance is claimed; (ii) to which parameter limits the items were actually tested; and (iii) whether the testing was done internally or externally by an independent testing facility.

== Related documents ==
- Environmental Conditions for Airborne Equipment: The document DO-160G, Environmental Conditions and Test Procedures for Airborne Equipment outlines a set of minimal standard environmental test conditions (categories) and corresponding test procedures for airborne equipment. It is published by the RTCA, Inc, formerly known as Radio Technical Commission for Aeronautics until their re-incorporation in 1991 as a not-for-profit corporation that functions as a Federal Advisory Committee pursuant to the United States Federal Advisory Committee Act.
- Environmental Test Methods for Defense material: The Ministry of Defence (United Kingdom) provides requirements for environmental conditions experienced by defence material in service via the Defence Standard 00-35, Environmental Handbook for Defence material (Part 3) Environmental Test Methods. The document contains environmental descriptions, a range of tests procedures and default test severities representing conditions that may be encountered during the equipment's life.
- NATO Environmental Guidelines for Defence Equipment: The North Atlantic Treaty Organization (NATO) provides guidance to project managers, programme engineers, and environmental engineering specialists in the planning and implementation of environmental tasks via the Allied Environmental Conditions and Test Publication (AECTP) 100, Environmental Guidelines for Defence material. The current document, AECTP-100 (Edition 3), was released January 2006.
- Shock Testing Requirements for Naval Ships: The military specification entitled MIL-DTL-901E, Detail Specification, Shock Tests, H.I. (High-Impact) Shipboard Machinery, Equipment, and Systems, Requirements for (often mistakenly referred to as MIL-STD-901) covers shock testing requirements for ship board machinery, equipment, systems, and structures, excluding submarine pressure hull penetrations. Compliance to the document verifies the ability of shipboard installations to withstand shock loadings which may be incurred during wartime service due to the effects of nuclear or conventional weapons. The current specification was released 20 June 2017.
- IEST Vibration and Shock Testing Recommended Practices: These documents are peer-reviewed documents that outline how to do specific tests. They are published by the Institute of Environmental Sciences and Technology.
- Ascott Anlaytical website for more information: MIL-STD-810H

== See also ==
- IP Code
- Rugged computer
- Rugged smartphone
- EN 62262
- Industrial PC
