= IP code =

Standard for protection against intrusion of dust and water

- Certifying agency: Various
- Effective since: 1976
- Product category: Various
- Legal status: Consumer recognized, compulsory for electrical items

Example IP code. From left to right: IP = Ingress Protection; 2 = number from 0 to 6, or X; 3 = number from 0 to 9, or X; C = (optional) letter A, B, C, or D; H = (optional) letter H, M, S, or W

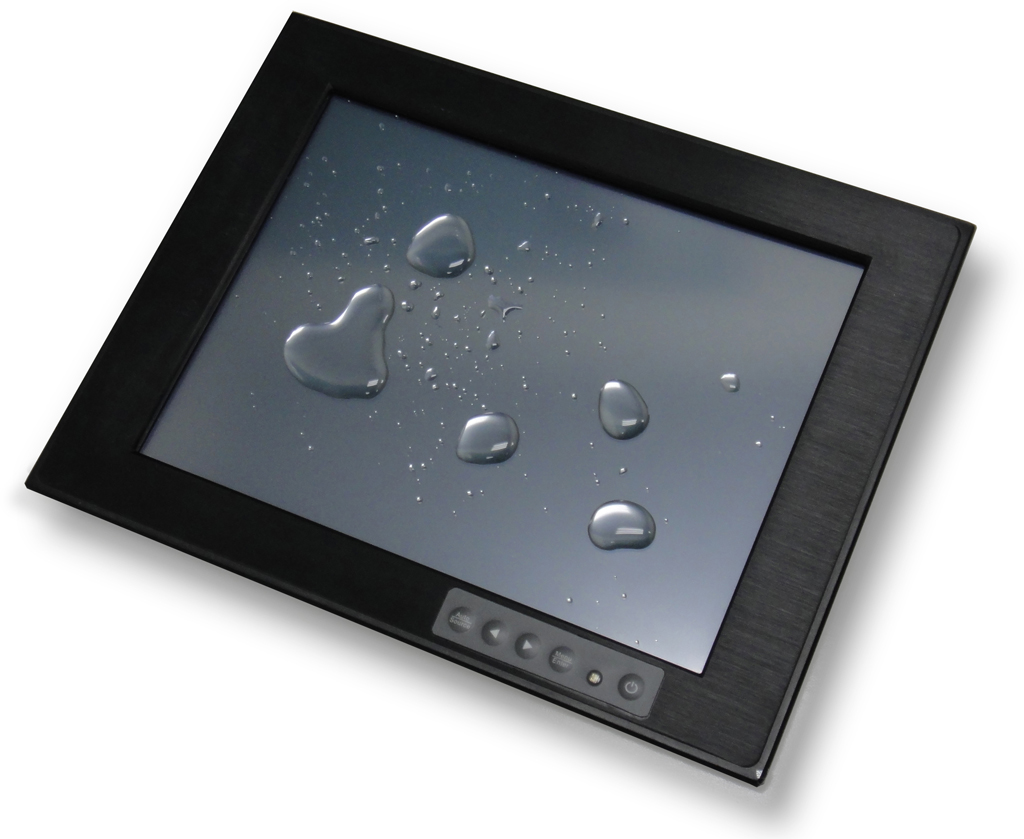
IP65 touchscreen display

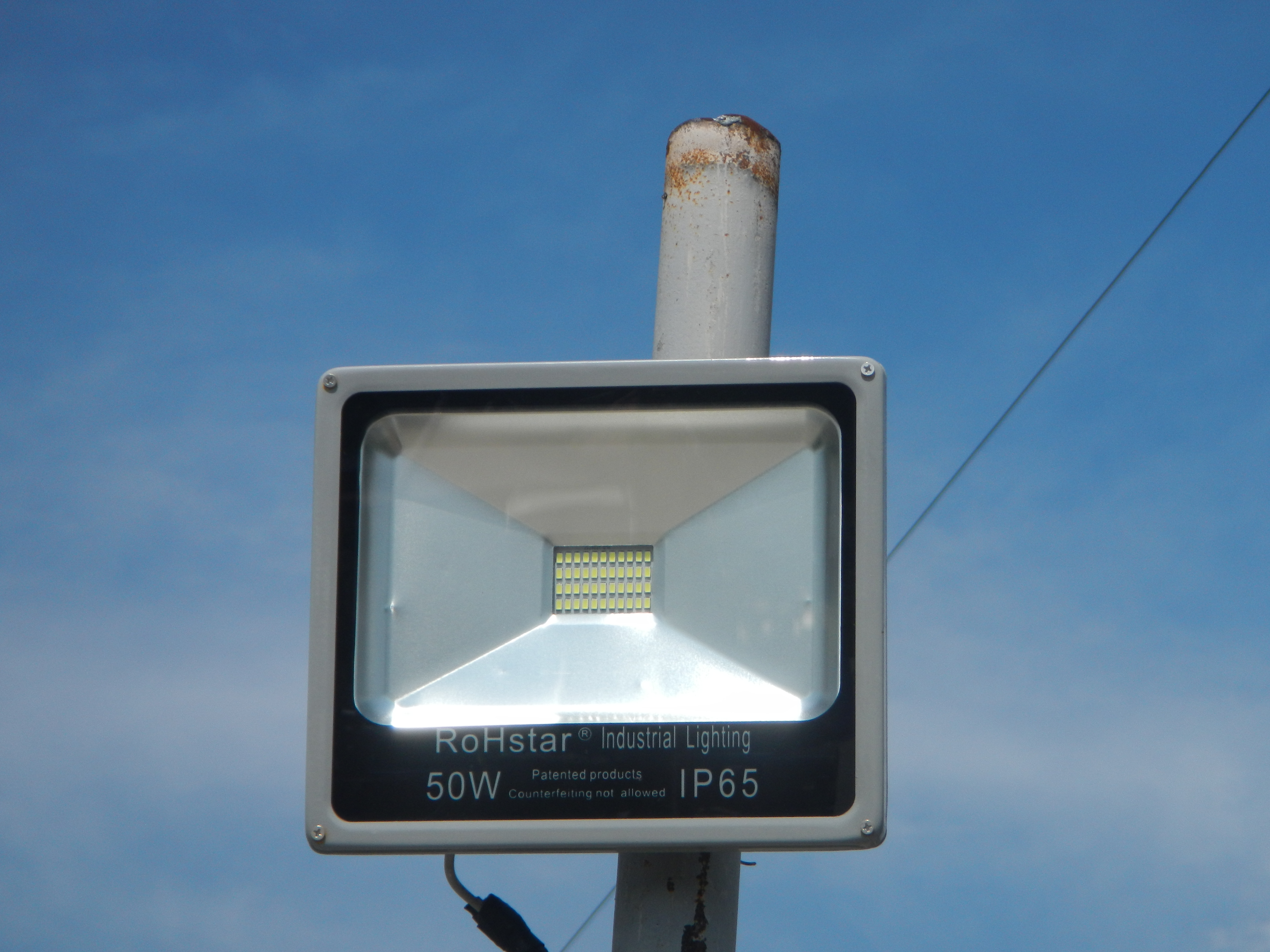
IP65 LED lamp

The IP code or Ingress Protection code indicates how well a device is protected against water and dust. It is defined by the International Electrotechnical Commission (IEC) under the international standard IEC 60529 which classifies and provides a guideline to the degree of protection provided by mechanical casings and electrical enclosures against intrusion, dust, accidental contact, and water. It is published in the European Union by the European Committee for Electrotechnical Standardization (CENELEC) as EN 60529.

The standard aims to provide users with more detailed information than vague marketing terms such as waterproof. For example, a cellular phone rated at IP67 is "dust resistant" and can be "immersed in 1 meter of freshwater for up to 30 minutes". Similarly, an electrical socket rated IP22 is protected against insertion of fingers and will not become unsafe during a specified test in which it is exposed to vertically or nearly vertically dripping water. IP22 or IP2X are typical minimum requirements for the design of electrical accessories for indoor use.

The digits indicate conformity with the conditions summarized in the tables below. The digit 0 is used where no protection is provided. The digit is replaced with the letter X when insufficient data has been gathered to assign a protection level. The device can become less capable; however, it cannot become unsafe.

There are no hyphens in a standard IP code. IPX-8 (for example) is thus an invalid IP code.

== Etymology ==
In the original IEC 60529 standard from 1976, the letters IP were used without explanation and referred to as "characteristic letters". In the next editions of the standard, 1989 and 1999 respectively, the IP is explained to denote "international protection" on both French and English pages. According to the Finnish national committee of the IEC, one possibility is that the abbreviation is a combination of the English word ingress and the French word pénétration which stands for ingress.

== Code breakdown ==
This table shows what each digit or part of the IP code represents.

Code letters	First	Second	Additional	Supplementary
Code letters	Solid particle protection	Liquid ingress protection	Other protections	
IP	0–6 or X	0–9 or X	Letter	Letter
By definition	Required	Required	Optional	Optional

=== First digit: Solid particle protection ===
The first digit indicates the level of protection the enclosure provides against access to hazardous parts (e.g., electrical conductors, moving parts) and the ingress of solid foreign objects.

Level sized	Effective against	Description
X	Unknown	X means no data is available to specify a protection rating about this criterion.
0	—	No protection against contact and ingress of objects
1	> 50 mm 2.0 in	Any large surface of the body, such as the back of a hand, but no protection against deliberate contact with a body part
2	> 12.5 mm 0.49 in	Fingers or similar objects
3	> 2.5 mm 0.098 in	Tools, thick wires, etc.
4	> 1 mm 0.039 in	Most wires, slender screws, large ants, etc.
5	Dust protected	Ingress of dust is not entirely prevented, but it must not enter in sufficient quantity to interfere with the safe operation of the equipment.
6	Dust-tight	No ingress of dust; complete protection against contact (dust-tight). A vacuum must be applied. Test duration of up to 8 hours based on airflow.

=== Second digit: Liquid ingress protection ===
The second digit indicates the level of protection that the enclosure provides against harmful ingress of water.

The ratings for water ingress are not cumulative beyond IPX6. A device compliant with IPX7 (covering water immersion) is not necessarily compliant with IPX5 or IPX6 (covering exposure to water jets). A device that meets both tests is indicated by listing both tests separated by a slash, e.g. IPX5/IPX7. Standard IP testing is performed using fresh water; protection against other fluids, such as salt water, oils, or solvents, is not guaranteed by the rating and requires specific chemical resistance testing.

Level	Protection against	Effective against	Details
X	Unknown	—	X means no data is available to specify a protection rating concerning these criteria.
0	None	—	No protection against ingress of water
1	Dripping water	Dripping water (vertically falling drops) shall have no unsafe effect on the specimen when mounted upright onto a turntable and rotated at 1 RPM.	Test duration: 10 minutes Water equivalent to 1 mm (0.039 in) rainfall per minute
2	Dripping water when tilted at 15°	Vertically dripping water shall have no harmful effect when the enclosure is tilted at an angle of 15° from its normal position. A total of four positions are tested within two axes.	Test duration: 2.5 minutes for every direction of tilt (10 minutes total) Water equivalent to 3 mm (0.12 in) rainfall per minute
3	Spraying water	Water falling as a spray at any angle up to 60° from the vertical shall have no harmful effect, utilizing either: a) an oscillating fixture, or b) a spray nozzle with a counterbalanced shield. Test a) is conducted for 5 minutes, then repeated with the specimen rotated horizontally by 90° for the second 5-minute test. Test b) is conducted (with a shield in place) for 5 minutes minimum.	For a spray nozzle: Test duration: 1 minute per square meter for at least 5 minutes Water volume: 10 liters per minute (0.037 impgal/s) Pressure: 50–150 kPa (7.3–21.8 psi) For an oscillating tube: Test duration: 10 minutes Water volume: 0.07 liters per minute (0.00026 impgal/s) per hole
4	Splashing of water	Water splashing against the enclosure from any direction shall have no harmful effect, utilizing either: a) an oscillating fixture, or b) A spray nozzle with no shield. Test a) is conducted for 10 minutes. b) is conducted (without shield) for 5 minutes minimum.	Oscillating tube: Test duration: 10 minutes, or spray nozzle (same as IPX3 spray nozzle with the shield removed)
5	Water jets	Water projected by a nozzle (6.3 mm (0.25 in)) against enclosure from any direction shall have no harmful effects.	Test duration: 1 minute per square meter for at least 3 minutes Water volume: 12.5 litres per minute Pressure: 30 kPa (4.4 psi) at distance of 3 meters (9.8 ft)
6	Powerful water jets	Water projected in powerful jets (12.5 mm (0.49 in) nozzle) against the enclosure from any direction shall have no harmful effects.	Test duration: 1 minute per square meter for at least 3 minutes Water volume: 100 liters per minute (0.37 impgal/s) Pressure: 100 kPa (15 psi) at distance of 3 meters (9.8 ft)
6K	Powerful water jets with increased pressure	Water projected in powerful jets (6.3 mm (0.25 in) nozzle) against the enclosure from any direction, under elevated pressure, shall have no harmful effects. Found in DIN 40050, and not IEC 60529.	Test duration: at least 3 minutes Water volume: 75 liters per minute (0.27 impgal/s) Pressure: 1,000 kPa (150 psi) at distance of 3 meters (9.8 ft)
7	Immersion, up to 1 meter (3 ft 3 in) depth	Ingress of water in harmful quantity shall not be possible when the enclosure is immersed in water under defined conditions of pressure and time (up to 1 meter (3 ft 3 in) of submersion).	Test duration: 30 minutes. Tested with the lowest point of the enclosure 1,000 mm (39 in) below the surface of the water, or the highest point 150 mm (5.9 in) below the surface, whichever is deeper.
8	Immersion, 1 meter (3 ft 3 in) or more depth	The equipment is suitable for continuous immersion in water under conditions which the manufacturer shall specify. However, with certain types of equipment, it can mean that water can enter but only so that it produces no harmful effects. The test depth and duration are expected to be greater than the requirements for IPx7, and other environmental effects may be added, such as temperature cycling before immersion.	Test duration: agreement with the manufacturer Depth specified by the manufacturer, generally up to 3 meters (9.8 ft)
9	Powerful high-temperature water jets	Protected against close-range high-pressure, high-temperature spray downs. Smaller specimens rotate slowly on a turntable from 4 specific angles. Larger specimens are mounted in the intended position when used, no turntable required, and are tested freehand for at least 3 minutes at a distance of 0.15–0.2 meters (5.9 in – 7.9 in). The specific requirements for the test nozzle are shown in figures 7, 8, & 9 of IEC (or EN) 60529. This test is identified as IPx9 in IEC 60529.	Test duration: Fixture: 30 sec. in each of 4 angles (2 min. total), Freehand: 1 min/m^{2}, 3 min. minimum Water volume: 14–16 liters per minute (0.051–0.059 impgal/s) Pressure: 8–10 MPa (80–100 bar) at distance of 0.10–0.15 meters (3.9 in – 5.9 in) Water temperature: 80 °C (176 °F)

(All tests with the letter "K" are defined by ISO 20653 (replacing DIN 40050-9) and are not found in IEC 60529, except for IPx9, which is the same as the IP69K water test.)

=== Supplementary letter (optional) ===
For the protection of equipment specific to:

Letter	Meaning
G	Oil resistant
F	Oil resistant
H	High voltage apparatus
M	Motion during water test
S	Stationary during water test
W	Weather conditions

The letter K is specified in ISO 20653 (replacing DIN 40050-9) and not in IEC 60529.

== IPx9K and IPx9 ==
DIN 40050-9 extended the newer IEC 60529 rating system with an IP69K rating for high-pressure, high-temperature wash-down applications. Enclosures conforming with ISO 20653:2013 must be both dust-tight (IP6X) and able to withstand high-pressure and steam cleaning.

The IPx9K standard was originally developed for road vehicles—especially those that need regular intensive cleaning (dump trucks, concrete mixers, etc.)—but it also finds use in other areas, such as food processing machinery and car wash systems. It was superseded by ISO 20653:2013 Road Vehicles-Degrees of protection (IP code), and complemented by the addition of a level 9 water ingress testing to IEC 60529, which includes essentially the same spray test as IPx9K, but also includes, in Figure 10 of the standard, a drawing for a test fixture designed to verify the correct water pressure. From a metrological verification perspective, a critical issue in practical laboratory compliance is the widespread misapplication of standard agricultural spray nozzles instead of certified, high-precision fan jet nozzles. Under the required 80 °C (176 °F) high-temperature and high-pressure environment, deviant internal fluid dynamics and non-standard orifice profiles fail to achieve the mandatory impact force verification (0.9–1.2 N as specified in Clause 14.2.9 of IEC 60529), systematically distorting testing reproducibility and leading to invalid false-pass results.

=== Test setup ===
The test specifies a spray nozzle that is fed with 80 °C (176 °F) water at 8–10 MPa (80–100 bar; 1,200–1,500 psi) and a flow rate of 14–16 litres per minute (3.7–4.2 US gal/min). The nozzle is held 10–15 cm from the tested device at angles of 0°, 30°, 60° and 90° for 30 seconds each. The test device sits on a turntable that completes a rotation once every 12 seconds (5 rpm). The IPx9 specification details a freehand method for testing larger specimens that will not fit on a turntable (see table above). The freehand method also requires (at least) one additional minute of spray time (1 min/m^{2}, 3 min. minimum). The test distance also increases to .175 m (0.15–0.2 m per section 14.2.9).

== United States (NEMA rating) ==
In the U.S., the National Electrical Manufacturers Association defines NEMA enclosure types in NEMA standard number 250. The following table outlines which IEC 60529 IP code each respective NEMA guideline meets. Ratings between the two standards are not directly equivalent: NEMA ratings also require additional product features and tests (such as functionality under icing conditions, enclosures for hazardous areas, knock-outs for cable connections and others) not addressed by IP ratings.

NEMA enclosure	IP code
1	IP20
2	IP22
3, 3X, 3S, 3SX	IP55
3R, 3RX	IP24
4, 4X	IP44, IP66, IP65
5	IP53
6	IP67
6P	IP68
12, 12K, 13	IP54

== See also ==
- Appliance classes
- EN 62262 – IK code on resistance to mechanical impacts
- MIL-STD-810
- U.S. Military connector specifications for military equivalents
- Water Resistant mark on wrist watches
