= Silicon quantum dot =

Metal-free biologically compatible quantum dots with photoluminescence

Silicon quantum dots are metal-free biologically compatible quantum dots with photoluminescence emission maxima that are tunable through the visible to near-infrared spectral regions. These quantum dots have unique properties arising from their indirect band gap, including long-lived luminescent excited-states and large Stokes shifts. A variety of disproportionation, pyrolysis, and solution protocols have been used to prepare silicon quantum dots. However, some solution-based protocols for preparing luminescent silicon quantum dots actually yield carbon quantum dots instead of the reported silicon. The unique properties of silicon quantum dots lend themselves to an array of potential applications: biological imaging, luminescent solar concentrators, light emitting diodes, sensors, and lithium-ion battery anodes.

== History ==
Silicon has found extensive use in electronic devices; however, bulk Si has limited optical applications. This is largely due to the vertical optical transition between the conduction band and valence band being forbidden because of its indirect band gap. In 1990, Leigh Canham showed that silicon wafers can emit light after being subjected to electrochemical and chemical dissolution. The light emission was attributed to the quantum confinement effect in the resulting porous silicon. This early work provided a foundation for several different types of silicon nanostructures including silicon nanoparticles (quantum dots), silicon nanowires, silicon nanoshells, silicon nanotubes, silicon aerogels, and mesoporous silicon.

The first reports of silicon quantum dots emerged in the early 1990s demonstrating luminescence from freestanding oxidized silicon quantum dots. Recognizing the vast potential of their unique optical properties, many researchers explored, and developed methods to synthesize silicon quantum dots. Once these materials could be prepared reliably, methods to passivate the surfaces were critical to rendering these materials solution processable and minimize the effects of oxidation. Many of these surface passivation methods draw inspiration from methods that were first developed for silicon wafers and porous silicon. Currently, silicon quantum dots are being commercialized by Applied Quantum Materials Inc. (Canada).

== Properties ==
Silicon quantum dots (SiQDs) possess size-tunable photoluminescence that is similar to that observed for conventional quantum dots. The luminescence is routinely tuned throughout the visible and into the near-infrared region by defining particle size. In general, there are two distinct luminescence bands that dominate silicon quantum dot properties. Long-lived luminescence excited states (S-band, slow decay rate) are typically associated with size-dependent photoluminescence ranging from yellow/orange to the near-infrared. Short-lived luminescent excited states (F-band, fast decay rate) are typically associated with size-independent blue photoluminescence and in some cases nitrogen impurities have been implicated in these processes. The S-band is typically attributed to the size-dependent band gap of the silicon quantum dots. This emission can be tuned from yellow (600 nm) into the infrared (1000 to 1100 nm) by changing the diameter of the silicon quantum dots from about 2 to 8 nm. Some reports also describe the preparation of green-emitting silicon quantum dots prepared by decreasing the size, however, these materials are challenging to isolate and require further development. Silicon quantum dot luminescence may also be tuned by defining their surface chemistry. Attaching different surface species allows tuning of silicon quantum dot luminescence throughout the visible spectrum while the silicon quantum dot dimensions remain unchanged. This surface tuning is typically accompanied by the appearance of nanosecond lifetimes like those seen for F-band luminescence. Silicon quantum dot photoluminescence quantum yields are typically in the range of 10 to 40%, with a handful of synthetic protocols providing values in excess of 70%.

The long-lived excited state of silicon quantum dot S-band luminescence that starkly contrasts photoemission from conventional quantum dots is often attributed to the inherent indirect band gap of silicon and lends itself to unique material applications. Combining long-lived excited states with the biological compatibility of silicon quantum dots enables time-gated biological imaging. The large Stokes shift allows them to convert photons from the ultraviolet range into the visible or infrared range and is particularly beneficial in the design and implementation of luminescent solar concentrators because it limits self-absorption while down converting the light.

Importantly, SiQDs are biologically compatible and do not contain heavy metals (e.g., cadmium, indium, lead). The biological compatibility of these materials has been carefully studied both in vitro and in vivo. During in vitro studies, SiQDs have been found to exhibit limited toxicity in concentrations up to 72 μg/mL in HeLa cells and 30 μg/mL in epithelial-like cells (MDA-MB-231). In vivo studies assessing biological compatibility of SiQDs undertaken in mice and monkeys (rhesus macaques) found "no signs of toxicity clearly attributable to SiQDs." In bacteria, SiQDs have been shown to be less toxic than both CdSe and CdSe/ZnS quantum dots.

== Synthesis ==
=== Synthesis methods ===
Silicon quantum dots can be synthesized using a variety of methods, including thermal disproportionation of silicon suboxides (e.g., hydrogen silsesquioxane, a silsesquioxane derivative), and laser and plasma-induced decomposition of silane(s). These methods reliably provide high quality SiQDs exhibiting size/band gap dependent (S-band) photoluminescence. Top-down methods, such as laser ablation and ball-milling have also been reported. Several solution-based methods have also been presented that often result in materials exhibiting F-band luminescence. Recently, it has been determined that some of these methods do not provide silicon quantum dots, but rather luminescent carbon quantum dots.

=== Size control ===
Defining the size of silicon quantum dots is essential because it influences their optical properties (especially S-band luminescence). Typically, the size of the silicon quantum dots is defined by controlling material synthesis. For example, silicon quantum dot size can be controlled by the reaction temperature during thermal disproportionation of silsesquioxanes. Similarly, the plasma residence time in non-thermal plasma methods is a key factor. Alternatively, post-synthetic protocols, such as density gradient ultracentrifugation, can be used to narrow the size distribution through separation.

=== Surface passivation and modification ===
The synthesis methods used to prepare SiQDs often result in reactive surfaces. Hydride-terminated SiQDs require post synthesis modification because they tend to oxidize under ambient conditions and exhibit limited solution processability. These surfaces are often passivated with organic molecules (e.g., alkyl chains) to render SiQDs resistant to oxidation and compatible with common solvents. This can then be passivated through methods, such as hydrosilylation. Much of the developed surface chemistry draws on well-established procedures used to modify the surface of porous silicon and silicon wafers. Hydrosilylation, which involves the formal addition of a Si-H bond across a C-C double or triple bond, is commonly used to introduce alkenes and alkynes to silicon quantum dot surfaces and also provides access to useful terminal functional groups (e.g., carboxylic acid, ester, silanes) that can define solvent compatibility and provide locations for further derivatization. The covalent bonding between the surface groups and the silicon quantum dot is robust and is not readily exchangeable – this is very different from the ionic bonding commonly used to tether surface groups to other types of quantum dots.

== Applications ==
Silicon quantum dots have been used in prototype applications owing to their biocompatibility and the ubiquitous nature of silicon, compared to other types of quantum dots. In addition to these fundamental properties, the unique optical properties of silicon quantum dots (i.e., long-lived excited states, large Stokes shift and tunable luminescence) can be advantageous for certain applications. Owing to these (and other) properties, the potential applications of SiQDs are diverse, spanning medical, sensing, defense, and energy related fields.

=== Biological imaging ===
The biocompatibility of silicon quantum dots along with their long luminescent lifetimes and near-infrared emission makes them well-suited for fluorescence imaging in biological systems. Due to this promise, silicon quantum dots have been applied for both in vitro and in vivo imaging. While steady-state imaging is traditionally used, the keen advantage of silicon comes into play for time-gated imaging. Time-gated imaging employs a delay between the excitation and the luminescence detection, this allows fluorophores with short lifetimes to relax, thus highlighting those with long lifetimes. This type of fluorescence imaging is useful for biological imaging as many tissues exhibit autofluorescence that can interfere with imaging. By using this technique, the signal to background ratio for imaging SiQDs can be increased up to 3x over conventional steady-state imaging techniques.

Other modes of imaging have also been explored for silicon nanomaterials. For example, the silicon core of large silicon nanoparticles has been used for ^{29}Si MRI in mice models. By modifying the surface with a ligand that can coordinate ^{64}Cu, PET imaging is also accessible. Further, doping with paramagnetic centers show promise for T_{1} and T_{2} weighted ^{1}H MRI.

=== Luminescent solar concentrators ===
Luminescent solar concentrators take advantage of the large Stokes shift of the silicon quantum dots to convert light into electricity. The large Stokes shift allows the SiQDs to convert UV light into red/near infrared light that is effectively absorbed by silicon solar cells, while having limited self absorption. The LSCs are designed to collect light and use the glass to waveguide the re-emitted light towards the edges of the glass, where the solar cells collect the light and convert it to electricity. By designing the LSC carefully, the silicon quantum dots can be prepared as a transparent film over the glass limiting losses due to scattering, while making them suitable as replacements for windows in buildings. To do this effectively, the surface of the silicon quantum dots can be modified with various ligands to improve polymer compatibility. It is also desirable to push the absorbance of the SiQDs into the visible to correspond better with the solar spectrum, which can be accomplished by adding a dye.

=== Light-emitting diodes ===
Quantum dot displays utilize quantum dots to produce pure monochromatic light. Most of the work designing LEDs based on silicon quantum dots have focused on electroluminescence of the silicon quantum dots. By changing the size of the SiQDs, the LED emission can be tuned from deep red (680 nm) to orange/yellow (625 nm). Despite promising initial results and advances towards improving the external quantum efficiency of the resulting LEDs, future work is required to overcome the broad luminescence emission.

=== Sensing ===
Photochemical sensors take advantage of the silicon quantum dot photoluminescence by quenching photon emission in the presence of the analyte. Photochemical sensors based on silicon quantum dots have been used to sense a wide variety of analytes, including pesticides, antibiotics, nerve agents, heavy metals, ethanol, and pH, often employing either electron transfer or fluorescence resonance energy transfer (FRET) as the method of quenching. Hazardous high energy materials, such as nitroaromatic compounds (i.e., TNT and DNT), can be detected at nanogram levels via electron transfer. In the electron transfer method, the energy level of LUMO of the molecule is between the valence and conduction bands of the silicon quantum dots, enabling the transfer of an excited state electron to the LUMO, and, therefore, preventing radiative recombination of the electron hole pair. This also works when the HOMO of the analyte is just above the conduction band of the SiQD, enabling the electron to transfer from the analyte to the SiQD.

Alternative methods of detection via quenching of the SiQD core have also been explored. By functionalizing the quantum dots with enzymes, various biologically relevant materials can be sensed due to the formation of metabolites. Using this method, glucose can be detected via the formation hydrogen peroxide that quenches luminescence. Another method uses ratiometric sensing, where a fluorescent molecule is used as a control and the relative intensities of the two fluorescent labels are compared. This method was used to detect organophosphate nerve agents visually at a lower concentration than can be observed for SiQD quenching alone.

== See also ==
- Cadmium-free quantum dot
