= Core–shell semiconductor nanocrystal =

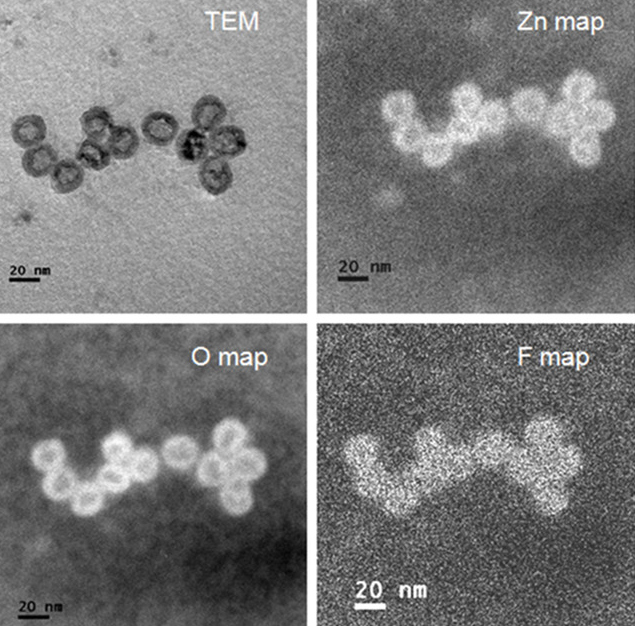
Electron micrograph of NaYF_{4}:Yb,Tm nanoparticles coated with ZnO (top left) and corresponding chemical maps confirming their chemical composition.

Core–shell semiconducting nanocrystals (CSSNCs) are a class of materials which have properties intermediate between those of small, individual molecules and those of bulk, crystalline semiconductors. They are unique because of their easily modular properties, which are a result of their size. These nanocrystals are composed of a quantum dot semiconducting core material and a shell of a distinct semiconducting material. The core and the shell are typically composed of type II–VI, IV–VI, I-III-VI, and III–V semiconductors, with configurations such as CdS/ZnS, CdSe/ZnS, CuInZnSe/ZnS, CdSe/CdS, and InAs/CdSe (typical notation is: core/shell) Organically passivated quantum dots have low fluorescence quantum yield due to surface related trap states. CSSNCs address this problem because the shell increases quantum yield by passivating the surface trap states. In addition, the shell provides protection against environmental changes, photo-oxidative degradation, and provides another route for modularity. Precise control of the size, shape, and composition of both the core and the shell enable the emission wavelength to be tuned over a wider range of wavelengths than with either individual semiconductor. These materials have found applications in biological systems and optics.

== Background ==
Colloidal semiconductor nanocrystals, which are also called quantum dots (QDs), consist of ~1–10 nm diameter semiconductor nanoparticles that have organic ligands bound to their surface. These nanomaterials have found applications in nanoscale photonic, photovoltaic, and light-emitting diode (LED) devices due to their size-dependent optical and electronic properties. Quantum dots are popular alternatives to organic dyes as fluorescent labels for biological imaging and sensing due to their small size, tuneable emission, and photostability.

The luminescent properties of quantum dots arise from exciton decay (recombination of electron hole pairs) which can proceed through a radiative or nonradiative pathway. The radiative pathway involves electrons relaxing from the conduction band to the valence band by emitting photons with wavelengths corresponding to the semiconductor's bandgap. Nonradiative recombination can occur through energy release via phonon emission or Auger recombination. In this size regime, quantum confinement effects lead to a size dependent increasing bandgap with observable, quantized energy levels. The quantized energy levels observed in quantum dots lead to electronic structures that are intermediate between single molecules which have a single HOMO–LUMO gap and bulk semiconductors which have continuous energy levels within bands

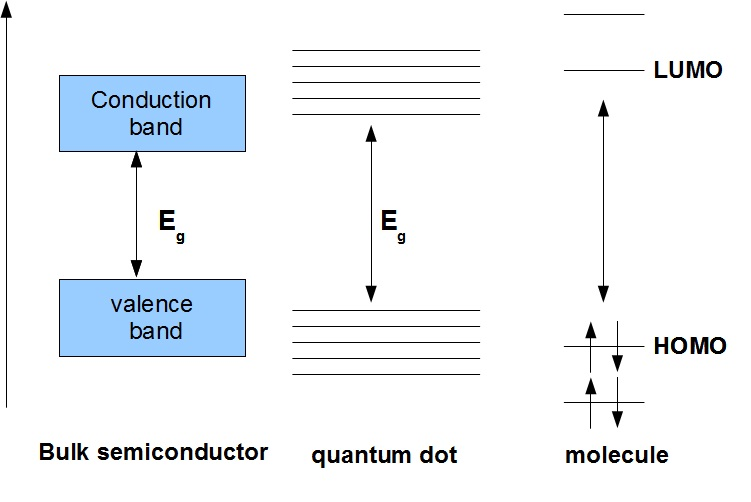
The electronic structure of quantum dots is intermediate between single molecules and bulk semiconductors.

Semiconductor nanocrystals generally adopt the same crystal structure as their extended solids. At the surface of the crystal, the periodicity abruptly stops, resulting in surface atoms having a lower coordination number than the interior atoms. This incomplete bonding (relative to the interior crystal structure) results in atomic orbitals that point away from the surface called "dangling orbitals" or unpassivated orbitals. Surface dangling orbitals are localized and carry a slight negative or positive charge. Weak interaction among the inhomogeneous charged energy states on the surface has been hypothesized to form a band structure. If the energy of the dangling orbital band is within the semiconductor bandgap, electrons and holes can be trapped at the crystal surface. For example, in CdSe quantum dots, Cd dangling orbitals act as electron traps while Se dangling orbitals act as hole traps. Also, surface defects in the crystal structure can act as charge carrier traps.

Charge carrier trapping on QDs increases the probability of non-radiative recombination, which reduces the fluorescence quantum yield. Surface-bound organic ligands are typically used to coordinate to surface atoms having reduced coordination number in order to passivate the surface traps. For example, tri-n-octylphosphine oxide (TOPO) and trioctylphospine (TOP) have been used to control the growth conditions and passivate the surface traps of high quality CdSe quantum dots. Although this method provides narrow size distributions and good crystallinity, the quantum yields are ~5–15%. Alkylamines have been incorporated into the TOP/TOPO synthetic method to increase the quantum yields to ~50%.

The main challenge in using organic ligands for quantum dot surface trap passivation is the difficulty in simultaneously passivating both anionic and cationic surface traps. Steric hindrance between bulky organic ligands results in incomplete surface coverage and unpassivated dangling orbitals. Growing epitaxial inorganic semiconductor shells over quantum dots inhibits photo-oxidation and enables passivation of both anionic and cationic surface trap states. As photogenerated charge carriers are less likely to be trapped, the probability for excitons to decay through the radiative pathway increases. CdSe/CdS and ZnSe/CdSe nanocrystals have been synthesized that exhibit 85% and 80–90% quantum yield, respectively.

Core–shell semiconductor nanocrystal architecture was initially investigated in the 1980s, followed by a surge of publications on synthetic methods the 1990s.

== Classification ==
Core–shell semiconductor nanocrystal properties are based on the relative conduction and valence band edge alignment of the core and the shell. In type I semiconductor heterostructures, the electron and holes tend to localize within the core. In type II heterostructures, one carrier is localized in the shell while the other is localized in the core.

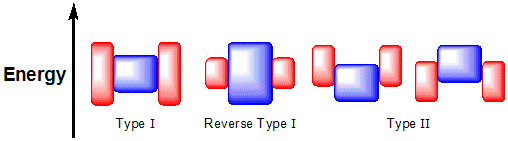
The three types of core–shell nanocrystals. The upper and lower edges represent the upper and lower energy edges of the core (blue) and the shell (red).

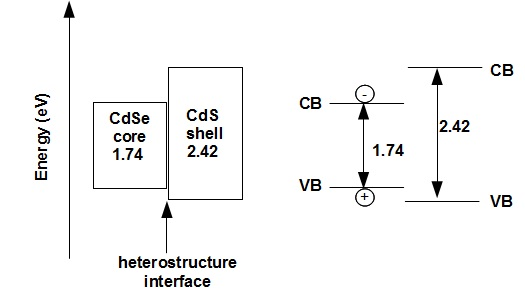
Type I core shell semiconductor nanocrystal (CdSe–CdS) band-edge alignment. VB=valence band, CB=conduction band

=== Type I ===
- Description

In a Type I CSSNC, the bandgap of the core is smaller than that of the shell. Both the conduction and valence band edges of the core lie within the bandgap of the shell, which confines both electrons and holes in the core. This can be seen in figure X, where the electron and hole of an exciton at the CdSe (bandgap:1.74 eV) /CdS (bandgap:2.42 eV) interface occupy energy states within the CdSe core, which corresponds to the lowest available energy separation. The emission wavelength due to radiative electron-hole recombination within the core is slightly redshifted compared to uncoated CdSe.

- Examples

CdSe/CdS, CdSe/ZnS, InAs/CdSe, InP/ZnS, InP/ZnSe, and ZnO/MgO

=== Reverse Type I ===
==== Description ====
In the reverse type I configuration, the core has a wider bandgap than the shell, and the conduction and valence band edges of the shell lie within those of the core. The lowest available exciton energy separation occurs when the charge carriers are localized in the shell. Changing the shell thickness tunes the emission wavelength.

==== Examples ====
CdS/HgS, CdS/CdSe, ZnSe/CdSe and MgO/ZnO

=== Type II ===
==== Description ====
In the type II configuration, the valence and conduction band edge of the core are both lower or higher than the band edges of the shell. An example of a type II is shown in figure X, ZnTe (bandgap:2.26) /CdSe (bandgap:1.74). The lowest energy separation of the electron and the hole will occur when the hole is confined in the ZnTe core valence band and the electron is confined in the CdSe shell conduction band. The emission wavelength will be determined by the energy difference between these occupied states, as shown by the red arrow, which will be at a lower energy than either of the individual bandgaps. The emission wavelength can be significantly red shifted compared to the unpassivated core.

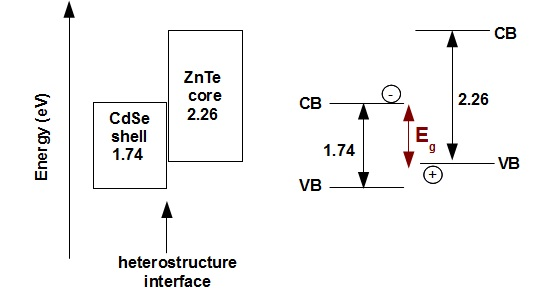
Type II core shell semiconductor nanocrystal (ZnTe/CdSe) band-edge alignment. Red arrow shows emission energy. VB=valence band, CB=conduction band

==== Examples ====
ZnTe/CdSe, CdTe/CdSe, CdS/ZnSe, InP/CdS, and InP/CdSe

=== Doped core-shell semiconductor nanocrystals ===
Doping has been shown to strongly affect the optical properties of semiconductor nanocrystals. Impurity concentrations in semiconductor nanocrystals grown using colloidal synthesis, however, are typically lower than in their bulk counterparts. There has been interest in magnetic doping of CSSNCs for applications in magnetic memory and spin-based electronics. Dual-mode optical and magnetic resonance (MR) imaging has been explored by doping the shell of CdSe/ZnS with Mn, which caused the CSSNC to be paramagnetic.

== Synthesis ==
In synthesizing core shell nanoparticles, scientists have studied and found several wet chemical methods, such as chemical precipitation, sol-gel, microemulsion and inverse micelle formation. Those methods have been used to grow core shell chalcogenide nanoparticles with an emphasis on better control of size, shape, and size distribution. To control the growth of nanoparticles with tunable optical properties, supporting matrices such as glasses, zeolites, polymers or fatty acids have been used. In addition, to prepare nanoparticles of sulfides, selenides and tellurides, the Langmuir–Blodgett film technique has been used successfully. In comparison to wet chemical methods, electrochemical synthesis is more desirable, such as the use of aqueous solvents rather than toxic organic solvents, formation of conformal deposits, room-temperature deposition, low cost, and precise control of composition and thickness of semiconductor coating on metal nanoparticles. However, owing to the difficulty of preparing electrically addressable arrays of nanoparticles, the use of electrochemical techniques to produce core-shell nanoparticles was difficult. Recently, Cadmium Sulfide (CdS) and Copper iodide (CuI) was electrochemically grown on a 3-D nanoelectrode array via layer-by-layer depositing of alternating layers of nanoparticles and Polyoxometalate (POM).

Core–shell semiconductor nanocrystals can be grown by using colloidal chemistry methods with an appropriate control of the reaction kinetics. Using this method which results in a relatively high control of size and shape, semiconductor nanostructures could be synthesized in the form of dots, tubes, wires and other forms which show interesting optic and electronic size-dependent properties. Since the synergistic properties resulting from the intimate contact and interaction between the core and shell, CSSNCs can provide novel functions and enhanced properties which are not observed in single nanoparticles.

The size of core materials and the thickness of shell can be controlled during synthesis. For example, in the synthesis of CdSe core nanocrystals, the volume of H_{2}S gas can determine the size of core nanocrystals. As the volume of H_{2}S increases, the size of the core decreases. Alternatively, when the reaction solution reaches the desired reaction temperature, rapid cooling can result in smaller core sizes. In addition, the thickness of shell is typically determined by the added amount of shell material during the coating process.

=== Characterization ===
An increase in either the core size or shell length results in longer emission wavelengths. The interface between the core and shell can be tailored to passivate relaxation pathways and form radiative states. The size dependence of the band gap in these nanoparticles due to the quantum confinement effect has been utilized to control the photoluminescence color from blue to red by preparing nanoparticles of varying sizes. By manipulating the size or shape of the nanoparticles, the luminescence colors and purity can be controlled. However, the quantum yield and the brightness of luminescence of the CSSNCs is ultimately limited and it cannot be controlled because of the presence of surface traps.

UV-vis absorption spectra, X-ray diffraction (XRD), transmission electron microscopy (TEM) and X-ray photoelectron spectroscopy (XPS) are the techniques typically used to identify and characterize CSSNCs.

== Purification techniques ==
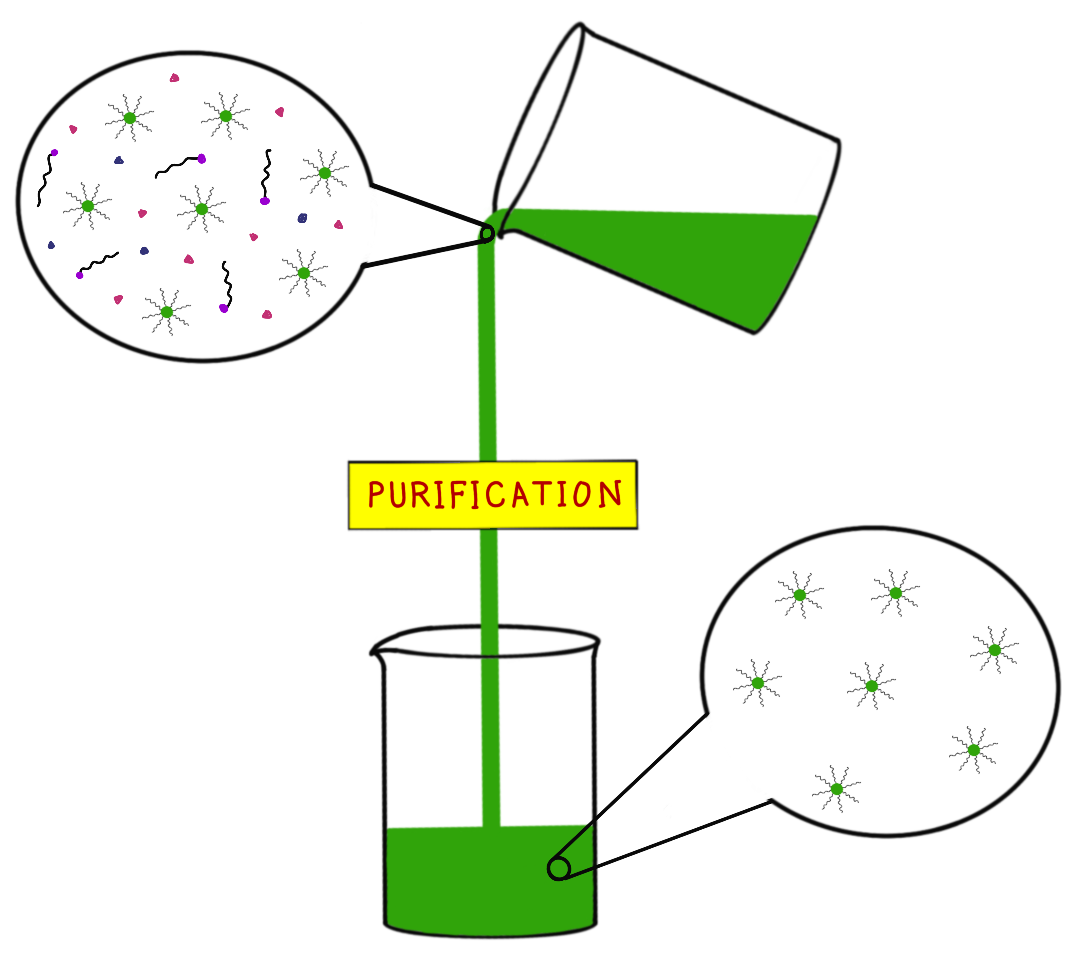
Simplified illustration of a purification technique of a after synthesis

As synthesized core-shell nanocrystals contains impurities, such as unreacted precursors, reaction by products, high b.p. solvents, and necessary ligands that were used during the synthesis of NCs to control growth. Such impurities often perturb the surface chemistry of the NCs and it directly reflects on their physical properties. In addition to this, the solvent that is used during synthesis barely resembles with the solvent into which the nanocrystals will be kept during the measurements of different types of physical properties of that NCs. Hence, for almost all cases, an effective means of purification is required after core-shell NC synthesis.

There are several purification techniques exist to purify CSNCs from as-synthesized CSNCs solution. A few of them discussed below:

=== Purification techniques based on polarity ===
==== Precipitation and re-dissolution ====
Generally, high boiling non-polar solvents are frequently used during the synthesis of CSNCs. By introducing an antisolvent (a solvent in which the desired product is insoluble) to the solvent mixture, a flocculated form of CSNCs can be achieved. When an antisolvent introduced in such solutions, it increases the polarity of that solvent mixture, which primarily governs the flocculation. However, this flocculated CSNCs then can be precipitated out from the solution by exploiting gravitational force or by means of centrifugation. This precipitated CSNCs, separated from impurities, then redispersed in a clean solvent. By repeating this process multiple times, purer form of CSNCs can be achieved. Through this method, a refine size distributed CSNCs can be found by adding a minimum amount of antisolvent until the point when the flocculation of CSNCs just begin to occur instead of fully precipitated the CSNCs.

The main advantage of the PR method is that it is scalable, hence, this method is favorite amongst scientists as a primary purification technique for CSNCs since the beginning. However, this method has certain drawbacks. For example, often the solubility properties of the impurities in as-synthesized CSNCs solution can be found almost similar to that of CSNCs, which make them difficult to isolate them from the impurities by this method. Another drawback of this method is, it can cause a substantial damage to the CSNCs surface, which negatively affect to their physical properties. For example, in 2012, Hens's group showed that methanol, an antisolvent, displaces the native ligand from CSNC surface by reacting with the surface of that CSNC, which reduces the stability of the CSNC, also negatively affected its optical properties.

==== Extraction ====
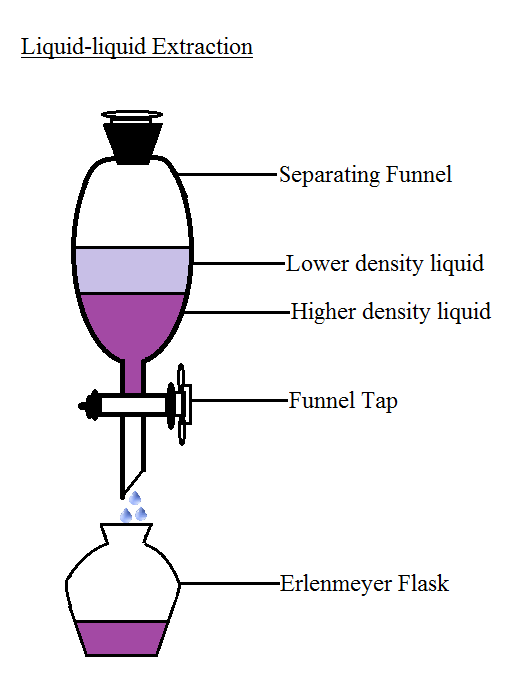
Liquid-liquid extraction

A liquid-liquid extraction process can be exploited as a purification technique for the CSNCs. When an extracting solvent is introduced to the as-synthesized CSNC solution, due to the partition coefficient, CSNCs and impurities are redistributed to different phases. This method has an advantage over the previously discussed PR method is that it is a much gentler process than PR method. Because, during extraction, the CSNCs tends to stay in their native phase, hence unwanted irreversible aggregation of CSNCs is less likely to occur.

A disadvantage of this method is that it requires a multiple extraction cycle to achieve an effective extraction, which is time-consuming. In addition to this, similarity in polarity between impurities and CSNCs greatly limits its efficiency as a purification method for CSNCs. To increase the extraction efficiency, sometimes a co-extractants can be used along with primary extracting solvent. A combination of both PR method and extraction method often can lead to a better purification of CSNCs.

=== Purification based on electrophoresis ===
Electrophoresis techniques are common as a purification technique for primarily proteins, DNA and RNA. Electrophoresis techniques exploit the mobility of two or more different species – different by their size, charge or binding affinity – under an electric field to separate them from one another. Nano-scientists, also use electrophoresis to separate CSNCs from impurities. Multiple evidence shows that CSNCs can be purified effectively by means of gel-electrophoresis techniques. However, as purification of CSNCs via gel-electrophoresis is highly time-consuming, recently, nano-scientists are shifting towards more advanced free-flow electrophoresis (FFE) and electrophoretic deposition (EPD) techniques.

== Applications ==
One of the most important properties of core–shell semiconducting nanocrystals (CSSNCs) is that their cores, which are quantum dots, fluoresce, which is important in their biomedical and optical applications. The shells are highly modular, and thus the bulk properties, such as solubility and activity of the CSSNCs can be changed.

=== Biomedical applications ===
The properties desired of CSSNCs when using them for biological applications include high quantum yield, narrow fluorescence emission, broad absorption profile, stability against photobleaching, 20 second fluorescent lifetime, and high brightness. High quantum yields mean that minimal energy will need to be put into the quantum dot to induce fluorescence. A narrow fluorescence emission allows for multiple colors to be imaged at once without color overlap between different types of CSSNCs. Having a broad absorption profile allows multiple CSSNCs to be excited at the same wavelength and thus, multiple CSSNCs could be imaged simultaneously. Having a 20-second fluorescent lifetime allows for time-resolved bioimaging. The utility of CSSNCs is that they can be a complement to organic fluorophores. CSSNCs are less susceptible to photobleaching, but less is known about them compared to organic fluorophores. CSSNCs have 100–1000 times the two-photon fluorescence efficiency as organic dyes, exemplifying their value. In the cases where CSSNCs are used in biological medium, the core is a quantum dot and the shell can be an organic molecule or biological ligands, such as a DNA, that are used for biocompatibility and targeting. The shell can also be an organic molecule to which a biological molecule is later conjugated, furthering the modularity of core–shell structure. The most popular core/shell pair used is CdSe core with ZnS or CdS shell, which improves the quantum yield and protects against photobleaching compared to that of the core material alone. The size of the CSSNC is directly correlated to the color of fluorescence, so being able to control particle size is desirable. However, it is generally unknown how the shell molecules, and salt concentration, pH, and temperature of the media affect the CSSNCs' properties and remains empirical.

==== In vitro cell labeling ====
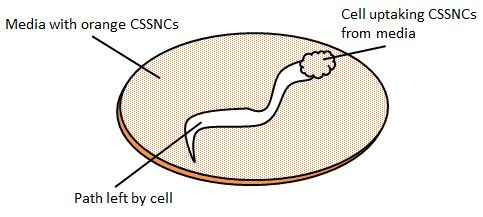
The pathway of the cells movement can be seen by the absence of CSSNCs

Because multiple colors can be imaged, CSSNCs' ability to be used in cell labeling is of growing importance. However, it can be difficult to get CSSNCs across the cell membrane. This has been achieved via endocytosis (the most common method), direct microinjection, and electroporation, and once in the cell, they become concentrated in the nucleus and can stay there for extended periods of time. Once CSSNCs are inside cells, they remain even after cellular division and can be imaged in both mother and daughter cells. This particular technique was shown using Xenopus embryos. Another example of CSSNCs is seen in their tracking ability; when cells are gown on a 2D matrix embedded with CSSNCs, cells uptake the CSSNCs as they move, leaving a trail seen as the absence of CSSNCs. This means that the mobility of cells can be imaged, which is important since the metastatic potential of breast tissue cells has been shown to increase with mobility. Also, it has been shown that five different toxins can be detected using five different CSSNCs simultaneously.

In a move toward environmentally friendlier and less toxic CSSNCs, Si quantum dots with various shells have been developed. Si is 10 times safer than Cd and current work is focused on making Si more water-soluble and biocompatible. In particular, Si quantum dots with poly (acrylic acid) and allylamine shells have been used in cell labeling. Other in vitro uses include flow cyclometry, pathogen detection, and genomic and proteomic detection.

==== In vivo and deep tissue imaging ====
Because CSSNCs emit in the near-infrared region (700–900 nm) of the electromagnetic spectrum, imaging them is not complicated by autofluorescence of tissue, which occurs at higher frequencies (400–600 nm), and scattering effects. This has been used in the mapping of sentinel lymph-nodes in cancer surgery in animals. Lymph nodes 1 cm deep were imaged and the excised nodes with CSSNC accumulation were found to have the highest probability for containing metastatic cells. In addition, CSSNCs have been shown to remain fluorescent in cells in vivo for 4 months. To track and diagnose cancer cells, labeled squamous carcinoma cell-line U14 cells were used and fluorescent images could be seen after 6h. CSSNCs conjugated to doxorubicin were also used to target, image, and sense prostate cancer cells that express the prostate-specific membrane antigen protein. Using a cancer-specific antibody conjugated to QDs with polymer shells is the most popular in tumor targeted imaging.

The main disadvantage of using CSSNCs for in vivo imaging is the lack of information about their excretion and toxicity. The typical cores used show DNA damage and toxicity toward liver cells, but using shells seems to diminish this effect. The use of other substances in the core, such as rare-earth elements and Si, are being explored to reduce toxicity. Other disadvantages include limited commercial availability, variability in surface chemistry, nonspecific binding, and instrument limitation.

=== Optics ===
The size, shape, and composition of the core–shell structure are related to the bandgap, which in turn is related to its optical properties. Thus, by modulating the size, shape, and material of the core, the optics can be tuned and optimized for use in optical devices and applications such as LEDs, detectors, lasers, phosphors, and photovoltaics.

==== LEDs ====
Currently, CSSNC LED efficiency is less than that of organic LEDs. However, studies show that they have potential to accomplish what organic LEDs cannot. CSSNC LEDs constructed using multiple layers of CSSNCs resulted in poor conduction, charge imbalance, low luminescence efficiency, and a large number of pinhole defects. LEDs constructed of one monolayer avoid these problems. An advantage of CSSNC LEDs over organic LEDs is that CSSNC LEDs have narrower emissions, as narrow as 32 nm, than organic LEDs, which range from 50–100 nm. Specifically, the core–shell motif is desirable for use in LEDs because of their electroluminescence and photoluminescence quantum efficiencies and their ability to be processed into devices easily. Current aims for LED displays include developing materials with wavelength emissions of 610–620 nm for red displays, 525–530 nm for green displays, and 460–470 nm for blue displays. This is because these wavelengths maximize the perceived power and they lie outside of the National Television System Committee standard color triangle. CSSNCs have been synthesized that meet these wavelength emissions: (CdSe)ZnS for red emission, (CdS)ZnS for blue emission, and (Cd_{x}Zn_{1−x}Se)Cd_{y}Zn_{1−y}S for the green emission. Using CdSe core and ZnS or CdS/ZnS shells, the maximum luminance values of red, orange, yellow and green LEDs were improved to 9,064, 3,200, 4,470 and 3,700 cd m^{−2}, respectively; electroluminescent efficiency (1.1–2.8 cd A^{−1}), and turn-on voltages (3–4 V) were also increased.

==== Lasers ====
In CSSNCs with only one exciton, absorption and stimulated emission occur equally and in CSSNCs with more than one exciton, non-radiative Auger recombination occurs, which decays optical gain, an important quality in lasers. However, type II CSSNCs, CdS/ZnSe, were used in optical amplification from stimulated emission of single-exciton states, eliminating Auger recombination. This has the advantage that lasing threshold could be lowered under continuous wave excitation, enhancing the potential of CSSNCs as optical gain media. Type II CSSNCs separate the electrons and holes of the exciton pair, which leads to a strong electric field and thus, reducing absorption losses.

==== Phosphors ====
By combining the modularity of CSSNCs and stability of organic polymer, a broad range of colors of phosphors were developed. CdSe core/ZnS shell CSSNCs are used to generate bluish green to red colors, and (CdS)ZnS QDs are used to generate violet to blue colors. By mixing the appropriate amounts of the different sizes of CSSNCs, the entire visible range with narrow emission profiles and high photoluminescence quantum yields can be achieved.

==== Dye-sensitized solar cells ====
ZnO-TiO_{2} core-shell nano-structures were synthesized with fast electron transport and high surface area combining the properties of ZnO nanorods and TiO_{2} nano particles. As ZnO nanorods have fast electron transport and TiO_{2} nano-particles have high surface area. ZnO-MgO core-shell nanowires were synthesized improving the efficiency of the dye sensitized solar cells by 400% when compared to the ZnO nanowires. MgO shell acts as efficient insulating tunnel preventing recombination.
