= Partial volume =

Partial volume may refer to:

- Partial volume (imaging)
- Partial gas volume
