= Silicon Valley Microelectronics =

US chipmaking company

SVM (Silicon Valley Microelectronics)
- Type: Private
- Industry: Semiconductors
- Founded: 1990; 36 years ago
- Headquarters: Santa Clara, California, U.S.
- Key people: Patrick Callinan (President & Founder)
- Products: Silicon Wafers & Services
- Number of employees: 30 (2023)
- Website: www.svmi.com

SVM (Silicon Valley Microelectronics) is an American privately held corporation that provides silicon wafers and services to the semiconductor industry.

SVM sells a variety of wafer diameters, including 100mm, 200mm, and 300mm Prime and Test device quality wafers. In addition to silicon, SVM also provides special materials such as gallium arsenide, indium phosphide, Silicon on Insulator and silicon carbide. SVM is based in California and offers grinding, polishing, film deposition, and other related wafer processing services as well.

== History ==
SVM inc. was founded by Patrick Callinan in 1990. Today the company owns a 30,000 square foot building, does approximately $50 million a year in sales, has 32 employees and a multi-million dollar inventory of product available for immediate shipment.
