= UiO MOFs =

UiO series of metal-organic frameworks

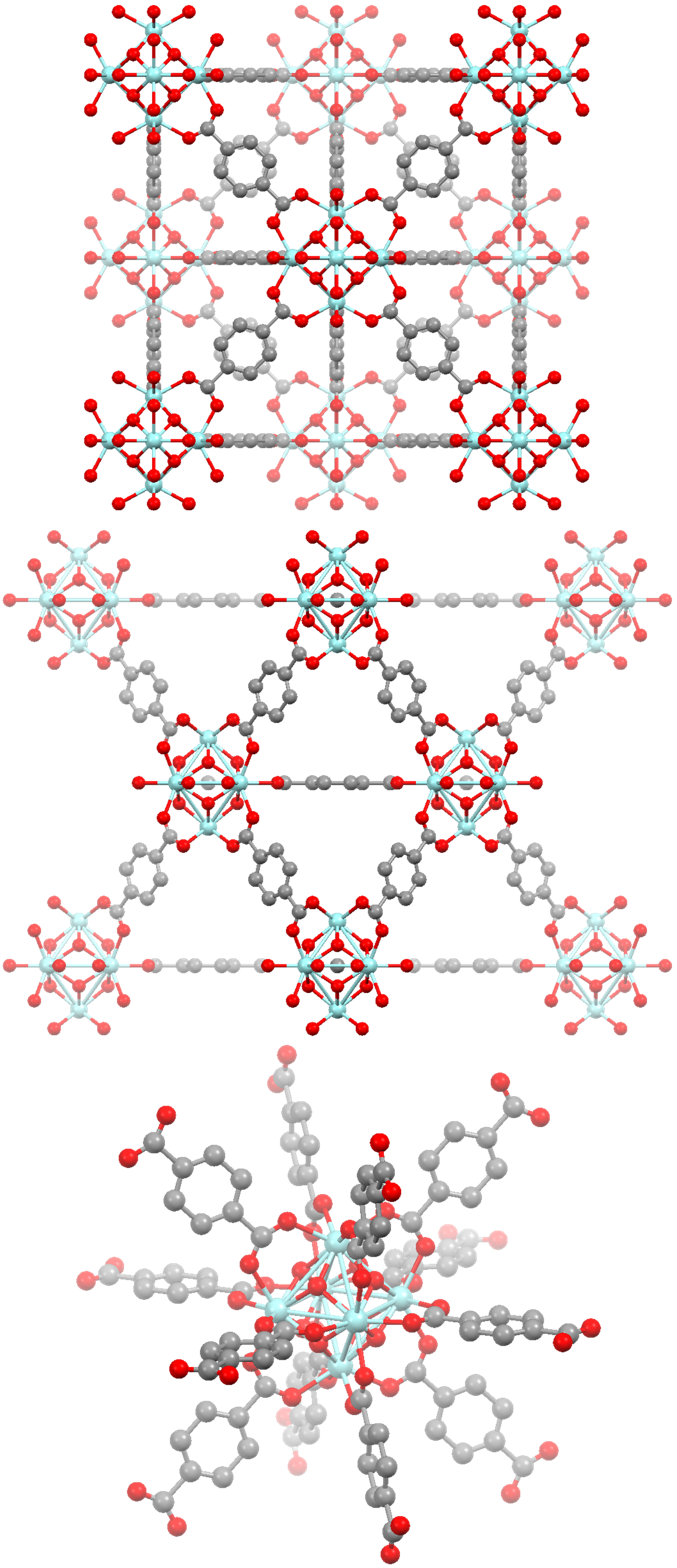
Crystal structure of UiO-66 (top), the structure rotated by 45° (middle), and the zirconium oxo cluster with twelve attached terepthalic acid ligands (bottom) with hydrogens omitted. Turquoise: zirconium, red: oxygen, grey: carbon.

The UiO (University of Oslo) series frameworks are a group of metal-organic frameworks (MOFs) that were first discovered in 2008 with the general formula Zr_{6}O_{4}(OH)_{4}(L)_{6}, where L is an organic ligand. UiO series MOFs contain zirconium oxo clusters that adopt an octahedral geometry with zirconium present in each of its vertices. In pristine UiO MOFs, each cluster binds to twelve organic ligands, but these MOFs are also stable with missing organic linkers, or defect sites. Non-modified UiO MOFs have a Fm3̅m space group. The zirconium oxo clusters with the bridging μ_{3}-OH, has D_{3d} symmetry. UiO MOFs have seen great interest in materials science for various applications including gas storage, radionuclide adsorption, catalysis, and sensing.

The series is made up of 4 members that differ in the number of phenyl rings in their organic linkers. The organic linkers are terepthalic acid, biphenyl-4,4′-dicarboxylic acid, terphenyl-4,4''-dicarboxylic acid, and quaterphenyl-4,4'-dicarboxylic acid for UiO-66, UiO-67, Ui-68, and UiO-69, respectively. UiO MOFs have seen significant research interest because of their high thermal stability (450-500°C), chemical stability, tunable pore size, and high accessible surface area. The high thermal and chemical stability of this class is due to, in part, the high oxophilicity of the zirconium making the Zr-O bond robust and the hardness of both the ligand's carboxylate group and the zirconium(IV) in the nodes. The decomposition observed around 500°C is caused by the break down of the phenyl groups of the organic ligands. The stability of the class is inversely proportional to the length of the organic ligand, so the UiO-69 structure is the least structurally robust. Defective sites in the MOFs tend to decrease the thermal and chemical stability of the structure, but allow for post-synthetic addition of new functional organic ligands.

== Synthesis ==
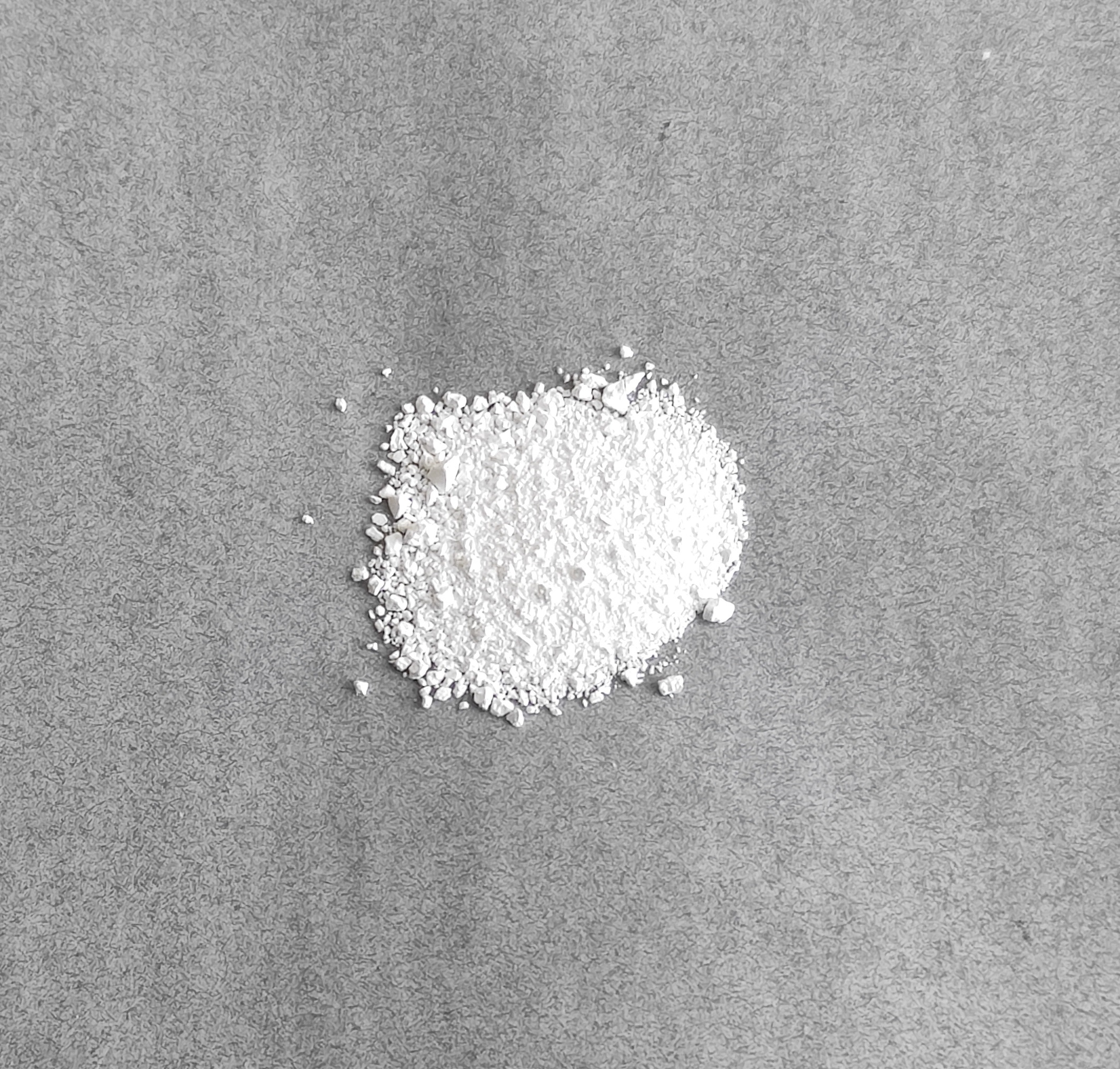
A sample of polycrystalline UiO-66 powder.

UiO MOFs are commonly produced via solvothermal methods, which are able to produce bulk crystalline powders. Solvothermal reactions of UiO MOFs are often done in dimethylformamide (DMF) and require elevated temperatures. When heated, DMF can break down to form dimethylamine and formic acid, which can act as a modulator in the synthesis. Modulators compete with the binding of the typical organic ligands and slow the growth of crystals, which improves the crystallinity and size of MOF particles.

Single crystals of UiO MOFs have been grown and analyzed by single-crystal X-ray diffraction (SCXRD) using the modulator growth method. Modulators act to slow down the growth and reduce the seeding of crystals, which allows for small single crystals to nucleate. SCXRD has allowed for detailed understanding of the structure of these MOFs and their defect sites. Where carboxylate ligands are typically located, defective sites are stabilized by hydroxide ions or solvent molecules like DMF or water.

A variety of other methods have been explored for the synthesis of UiO MOFs, including microwave, electrochemical, and ultrasonic methods.

== UiO analogs ==
Isoreticular structures of UiO MOFs have been made with other tetravalent metals including hafnium, cerium, thorium, and plutonium. A variety of other structures have been produced that use organic ligands that have been modified before the synthesis of the structure. One commonly used example is NH_{2}-UiO-66, which uses aminoterephthalic acid as the organic ligand, which can be modified post-synthetically to further functionalize the material.
