= Vignesh Kumaravel =

- Occupation: university professor

Academic background
- Education: PhD: 2013, Madurai Kamaraj University Habilitation: 2023, Łódź University of Technology

Academic work
- Discipline: chemistry
- Institutions: International Centre for Research and Innovative Biobased Materials (ICRI-BioM) at Łódź University of Technology

Vignesh Kumaravel – is a habilitated doctor, university professor, chemist, and scientist affiliated with the International Centre for Research and Innovative Biobased Materials (ICRI-BioM) at Łódź University of Technology. He serves as the Acting Director of ICRI-BioM and leads the Biomaterials Group as a Senior Principal Investigator.

== Education ==
Vignesh Kumaravel is a chemist by training. He obtained his PhD in Chemistry in 2013 from Madurai Kamaraj University, India. He earned his habilitation degree in Chemical Sciences in February 2023 from Łódź University of Technology.

== Scientific career ==
Before joining Łódź University of Technology, he conducted research at scientific institutions in Ireland, Qatar, South Korea, Malaysia, and India. Since November 2021, he has been working at the International Centre for Research and Innovative Biobased Materials (ICRI-BioM), where he took charge of a research group focused on polymers and biomaterials. Since early 2023, he has served as the Acting Director of the Centre.

His research focuses on the application of functional nanomaterials in areas including food safety, infectious diseases, greenhouse gas emissions, and energy-related challenges.

He is involved in research projects concerning biomaterials, functional materials, and antimicrobial technologies. In 2025, he led the Polish team participating in the NIR-CURATOR project, which focused on the development of orthopedic implants with active antimicrobial coatings.

Vignesh Kumaravel’s research interests include polymers and antimicrobial coatings, antimicrobial medical implants, active and intelligent packaging, carbon dioxide capture and conversion, green hydrogen production, water disinfection, hydrogels, carbon-based materials, including graphene quantum dots and graphene oxide, self-cleaning surfaces derived from agricultural waste.
