= Renata Reisfeld =

Israeli chemist

- רנטה ריספלד
- Professor Renata Reisfeld
- Born: 1930 (age 95–96); Chełm, Poland
- Education: Hebrew University
- Known for: Sol-Gel, fluorescence resonance energy transfer, rare earth elements, Optical coatings, Photovoltaic electricity, Nanoparticles, Luminescent solar concentrators
- Awards: Medal of Honor, Lyon, France
- Scientific career
- Fields: Chemistry
- Workplaces: Hebrew University; University of Geneva; University of Lyon; University of Bucharest; Paris VI University; Paris-Sud 11 University Orsay; University of Sydney; Polish Academy of Sciences, Wrocław, Poland
- Doctoral students: 28 PhD and Master thesis

Renata Reisfeld (Hebrew: רנטה ריספלד; née Sobel) is an Israeli Professor of Chemistry and D.H.C. Enrique Berman Professor of Solar Energy at Institute of Chemistry of the Hebrew University of Jerusalem, author of 532 scientific papers cited more than 30,000 times.

== Biography ==
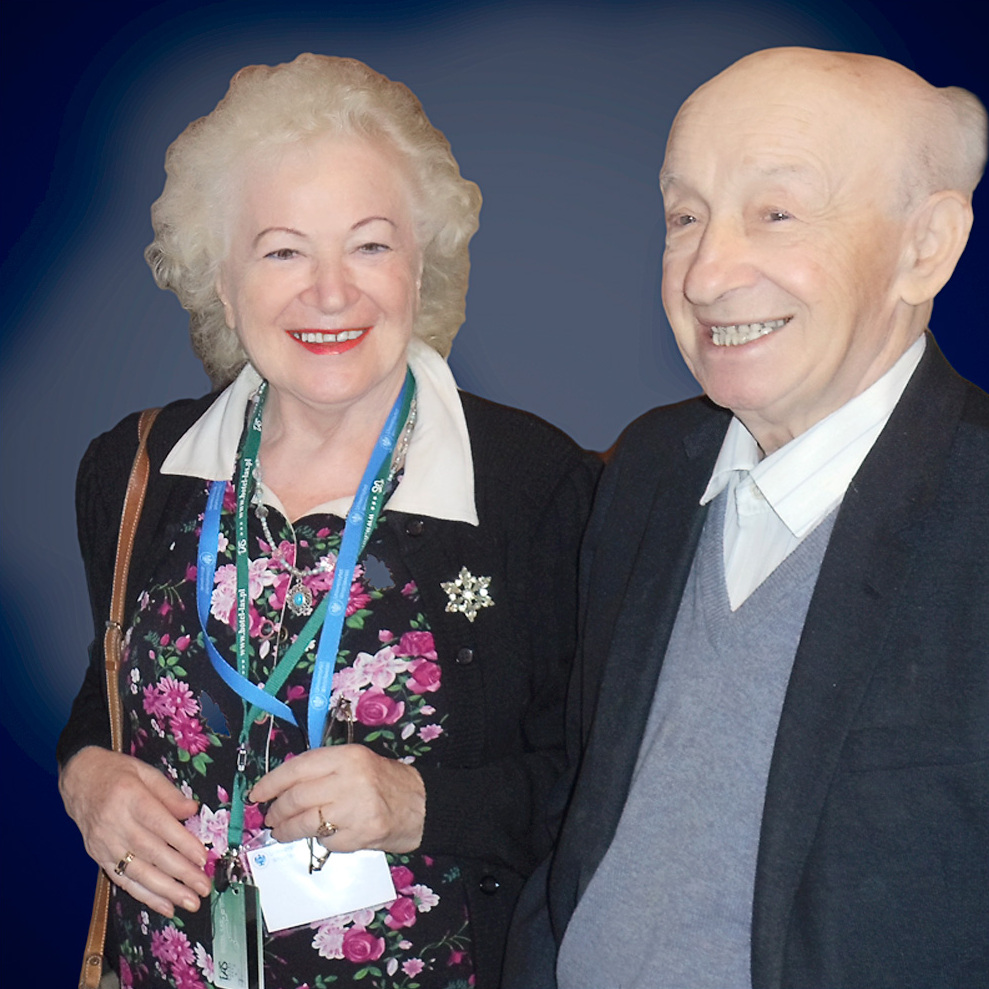
Rina and Eliezer

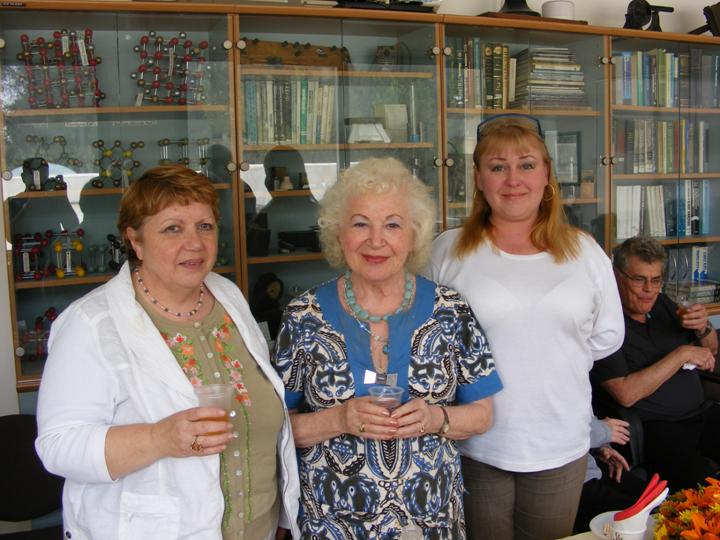
Center - Professor Renata Reisfeld, right - researcher Viktoria Levchenko, left - researcher Tsiala Saraidarov

Renata Sobel was born in Chelm, Poland in 1930. She came to Israel in 1950 and graduated from the Hebrew University of Jerusalem. Her husband is Lazar Eliezer Reisfeld; her children are Danny and Gideon.

Reisfeld became the head of the science research team at The Institute of Chemistry of the Hebrew University of Jerusalem in 1975. Reisfeld's research interests are luminescent solar concentrators for decreasing the price of photovoltaic electricity, interaction of nanoparticles with luminescent species, anti-reflecting coating, and Sol-Gel glasses. She began developing solar concentrators with her research team in 1978.

From 2007 until 2010, Reisfeld acted at GreenSun Energy Ltd as Chief Scientist.

On 4 July 1976, Reisfeld was among the 102 hostages rescued by Israeli troops at the airport of Entebbe, Uganda. A week earlier, she had been a passenger aboard Air France flight 139 from Tel Aviv via Athens to Paris that was abducted by a commando of Palestinian and German air pirates attempting to press for the release of 55 mainly Palestinian prisoners held in Israel and other countries on terrorism charges. Reisfeld was one of several witnesses who shared their experiences in media interviews immediately after their return to Israel as well as on the occasion of the event's 40-year anniversary.

== Recognition ==
In 1993 she received an Honorary degree – Doctor Honoris Causa from the University of Lyon, France. In 1993 she was awarded the Medal for scientific achievement of Mayor Lyon, France. In 1998 she received an Honorary degree – Doctor Honoris Causa from the University of Bucharest, Romania. In 2005 she received an Honorary degree – Professor Honoris Causa from the Polish Academy of Sciences, Wrocław, Poland. In 2010 she was awarded the Gold Medal of the University of Wrocław, Poland.

In 2018, the Journal of Luminescence published a special issue in honor of Reisfeld. In 2018, Elsevier highlighted her contributions to physics. In 2020, the International Sol-Gel Society established the Renata Reisfeld Fellowship.

== Books ==
- R. Reisfeld and C.K. Jorgensen, Lasers and Excited States of Rare Earths, Springer-Verlag, Berlin Heidelberg, New York City 1977.
- M. Gaft, R. Reisfeld and G. Panczer, Luminiscence Spectroscopy of Minerals and Materials, Springer-Verlag, 2005.
- M. Gaft, R. Reisfeld and G. Panczer, Modern Luminiscence Spectroscopy of Minerals and Materials, Springer Mineralogy, 2016.

== See also ==
- Hebrew University of Jerusalem – see Notable alumni
- Luminescent solar concentrators
