= GreenSun Energy =

GreenSun Energy is a Jerusalem-based Israeli company that has developed a new process for producing electricity from solar energy. As The Economist points out, solar energy is a logical development since "Israel is a country with plenty of sunshine, lots of sand and quite a few clever physicists and chemists." The company was founded in 2012 with the goal of helping businesses and individuals reduce their carbon footprint and save money on energy costs. GreenSun Energy operates in a number of locations across the United States, and offers a variety of financing options to make it easier for customers to adopt renewable energy technologies.

== Process ==
Traditional photovoltaic cells are made from thin sheets of silicon covered by glass plates. In the GreenSun process, it is only the outer edges of the glass plates that are covered by thin strips of silicon. The physicists and chemists at GreenSun, led by Renata Reisfeld, coat the glass with metallic nanoparticles and dyes to cause the sunlight falling on the glass to diffuse sideways toward the edges where the silicon strips turn it into electricity.

A mixture of dyes is used to capture and absorb a wide spectrum of available light. Having absorbed the sunlight, the fluorescent dyes then re-radiate it. Interaction with the metallic nanoparticles turns light into a form of electromagnetic radiation known as surface plasmons. The surface plasmons propagate over the glass surface and are intercepted by the silicon strips at the edges. The company would not reveal which metals are used in the process.

Because the process uses less silicon, it is far less expensive than conventional photovoltaic modules. It is also more efficient. In a conventional photovoltaic cell, much of the sun's energy is lost as heat because the energy of light varies across the spectrum (red light is less energetic than blue, for example). Only a particular amount of energy is needed to knock an electron free from the silicon atoms. If the sunlight is more energetic than necessary, more energy than usual is lost as heat. Sunlight scatters its energy, but the dye/nanoparticle mix in the GreenSun process delivers plasmons and photons of the right energy to knock electrons free more efficiently.

== Economics ==
GreenEnergy CEO Amnon Leikovich claims that the process, once put into production, could deliver electricity at about double the cost of a conventional power station. Traditional photovoltaic modules deliver electricity at about five times the cost of a conventional power plant. Leikovich hopes that costs can be brought down even further.

According to corporate spokesmen Eitan Shmueli, GreenSun's photovoltaic panels are capable of producing electricity from low-intensity sunlight on cloudy days and from sunlight that reaches them from any angle. The company claims that can turn the windows or walls of buildings into electricity-generating photovoltaic panels.
