= Indium phosphide =

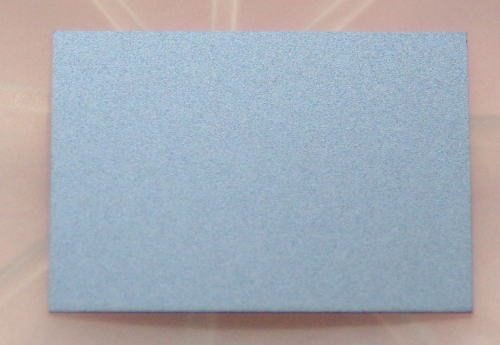

- Crystal structure

Names
- Other names Indium(III) phosphide

Identifiers
CAS Number	22398-80-7
3D model (JSmol)	Interactive image; Interactive image
ChemSpider	28914
ECHA InfoCard	100.040.856
PubChem CID	31170
UNII	SD36LG60G1
CompTox Dashboard (EPA)	DTXSID3031444
- InChI: InChI=1S/In.P Key: GPXJNWSHGFTCBW-UHFFFAOYSA-N; InChI=1/In.P/rInP/c1-2 Key: GPXJNWSHGFTCBW-HIYQQWJCAF
- SMILES: [In+3].[P-3]; [In]#P

Properties
Chemical formula	InP
Molar mass	145.792 g/mol
Appearance	black cubic crystals
Density	4.81 g/cm^{3}, solid
Melting point	1,062 °C (1,944 °F; 1,335 K)
Solubility	slightly soluble in acids
Band gap	1.344 eV (300 K; direct)
Electron mobility	5400 cm^{2}/(V·s) (300 K)
Thermal conductivity	0.68 W/(cm·K) (300 K)
Refractive index (n_{D})	3.1 (infrared); 3.55 (632.8 nm)

Structure
Crystal structure	Zinc blende
Lattice constant	a = 5.8687 Å
Coordination geometry	Tetrahedral

Thermochemistry
Heat capacity (C)	45.4 J/(mol·K)
Std molar entropy (S^{⦵}_{298})	59.8 J/(mol·K)
Std enthalpy of formation (Δ_{f}H^{⦵}_{298})	−88.7 kJ/mol
Gibbs free energy (Δ_{f}G^{⦵})	−77.0 kJ/mol

Hazards
- Occupational safety and health (OHS/OSH)
Main hazards	Toxic, hydrolysis to phosphine
Safety data sheet (SDS)	External MSDS

Related compounds
Other anions	Indium nitride Indium arsenide Indium antimonide
Other cations	Aluminium phosphide Gallium phosphide
Related compounds	Indium gallium phosphide Aluminium gallium indium phosphide Gallium indium arsenide antimonide phosphide
- Except where otherwise noted, data are given for materials in their standard state (at 25 °C [77 °F], 100 kPa). verify (what is ?) Infobox references

Indium phosphide (InP) is a binary semiconductor composed of indium and phosphorus. It crystallizes in a face-centered cubic ("zincblende") structure, which is shared by most III–V semiconductors.

== Manufacturing ==
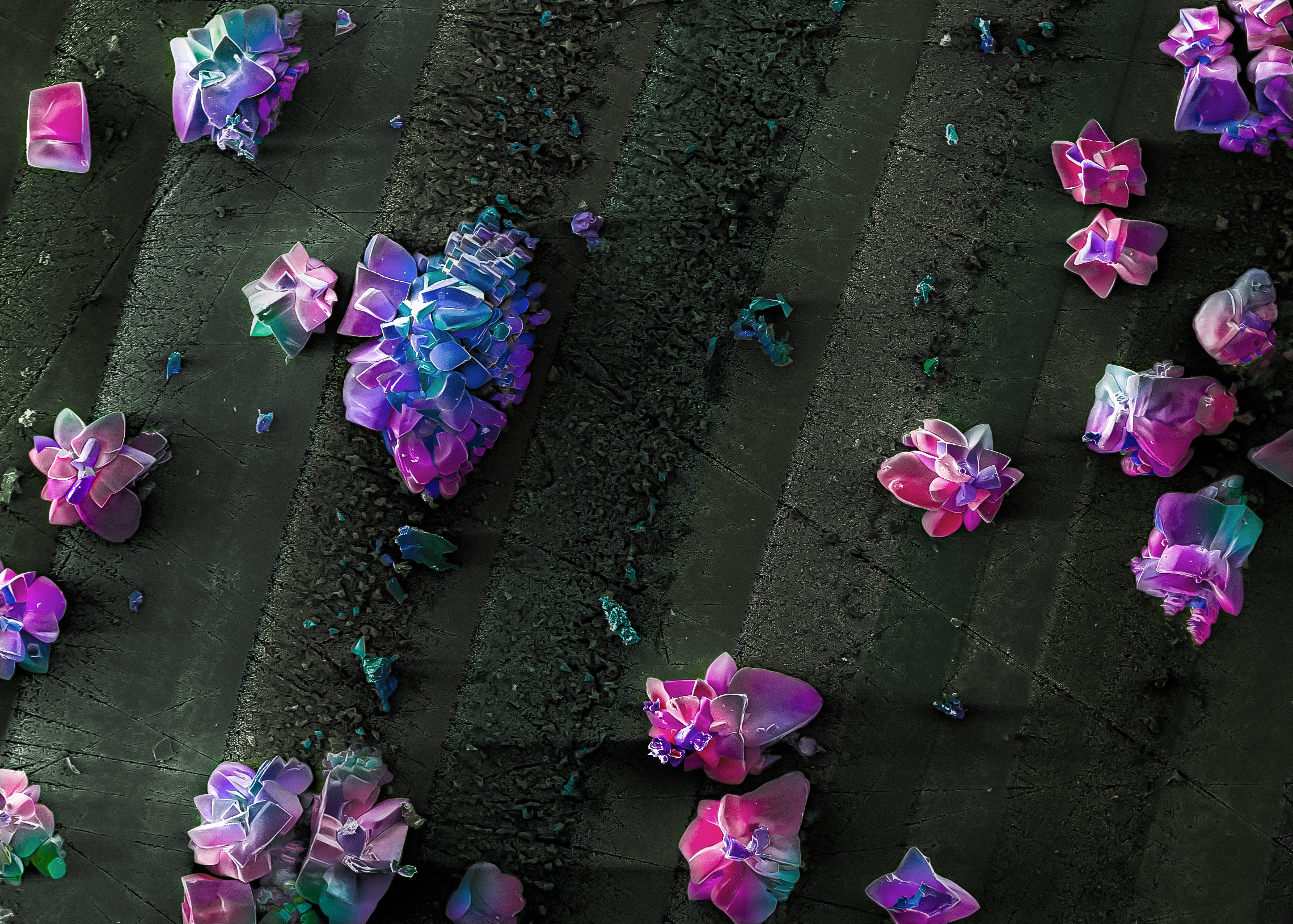
Indium phosphide nanocrystalline surface obtained by electrochemical etching and viewed under scanning electron microscope. Artificially colored in image post-processing.

Indium phosphide can be prepared from the reaction of white phosphorus and indium iodide at 400 °C., also by direct combination of the purified elements at high temperature and pressure, or by thermal decomposition of a mixture of a trialkyl indium compound and phosphine.

== Applications ==
The application fields of InP splits up into three main areas. It is used as the basis for optoelectronic components, high-speed electronics, and photovoltaics

=== High-speed optoelectronics ===
InP is used as a substrate for epitaxial optoelectronic devices based other semiconductors, such as indium gallium arsenide. The devices include pseudomorphic heterojunction bipolar transistors that could operate at 604 GHz.

InP itself has a direct bandgap, making it useful for optoelectronics devices like laser diodes and photonic integrated circuits for the optical telecommunications industry, to enable wavelength-division multiplexing applications. It is used in high-power and high-frequency electronics because of its superior electron velocity with respect to the more common semiconductors silicon and gallium arsenide.

=== Optical Communications ===
InP, a direct bandgap III-V semiconductor, is used in lasers, sensitive photodetectors, modulators, and optical amplifiers in the wavelength window of 850 nm to 1625 nm typically used for telecommunications. InP-based devices operate at 1310/1550 nm wavelengths, with the latter falling within the window of least signal distortion and loss, enabling efficient, long-range transmission.

=== Photovoltaics and optical sensing ===
InP can be used in photonic integrated circuits that can generate, amplify, control and detect laser light.

Optical sensing applications of InP include

- Atmospheric gas monitoring, such as remote measurement of CO₂.
- Spectroscopy for non-destructive control of product, such as food. Researchers of Eindhoven University of Technology and MantiSpectra have already demonstrated the application of an integrated near-infrared spectral sensor for milk. In addition, it has been proven that this technology can also be applied to plastics and illicit drugs.

== Indium Phosphide Quantum Dots ==
Illustration of increasing bandgap with decreasing crystal size and energy quantization due to quantum confinement.

InP quantum dots (QDs), due to their small size, experience quantum confinement, causing their band gap to be size-dependent and giving them properties that differ from those of the bulk material. While cadium and lead based QDs have been leading the industry, due to their toxicity, there's a growing shift towards cadmium-free QDs, and InP QDs are gaining more attention as a lower-toxicity alternative. InP has a large exciton Bohr radius (~10.0 nm), about double that of CdSe, causing pronounced quantum confinement effects that thereby enables wide emission tuning from the visible to near-infrared (NIR) spectrum through size manipulation of the QD. However, as slight changes in size lead to measurably different band gaps, this large exciton Bohr radius makes the band gap very sensitive to size variations, causing broader emission line-widths for InP than Cd-based QDs.

=== Synthesis ===
==== Precursors ====
Colloidal InP QDs were first synthesized using an organometallic reaction between InCl_{3} and tris(trimethylsilyl) phosphine. However, while this phosphorus precursor reacts readily and allows for the rapid formation of InP monomers, it is also pyrophoric and expensive. As such, precursors with lower costs and reactivity, and thus improved safety, such as aminophosphines, elemental phosphorus, and calcium phosphide are now commonly used along with an InX_{3} salt.

==== Methods of Synthesis ====
The main methods of synthesis from these precursors to form InP QDs are hot injection, heat-up, solvothermal, cation exchange, seeded growth, and continuous flow microfluidic synthesis. Each of these synthetic routes possesses strengths and limitations in terms of size uniformity, scalability, activation energy requirements, and feasibility/safety.

Solvothermal and cation exchange methods enable relative control over size, but struggle with safety and defects. Solvothermal/hydrothermal methods facilitate the instantaneous crystallization of InP monomers into core structures. While this offers precise control over size, it also requires high temperature and pressure which decreases the safety of operation. Cation exchange uses template nanocrystals with copper or cadmium cations and converts them to InP, an exchange driven by solvation energy and Lewis acid-base interactions. Through this conversion the anion network is maintained, allowing for specification of size and morphology, but incomplete exchanges of cations can also create defects.

Seeded growth and hot injection provide size uniformity while maintaining feasibility, making them advantageous for large and small InP QD synthesis, respectively. In seeded growth, preformed InP seeds act as heterogeneous templates, thereby decreasing the nucleation barrier, suppressing self-nucleation, and producing QDs with narrower size distributions. However, this method is biased towards the production of larger InP QDs and is difficult to apply to smaller ones. In hot-injection, a rapid injection of precursors into a hot solvent causes a short nucleation burst followed by a drop in temperature and reduced precursor concentration that prevents further nucleation. This thereby separates the nucleation and growth stages, providing greater control over the final QD size and allowing for synthesis of small InP QDs.

Synthesis of InP/ZnS core-shell quantum dot via the heat-up method where precursors are mixed at room temperature followed by controlled heating, allowing for scalability but resulting in poor size uniformity.

For the microfluidic synthesis and the heat-up methods, strengths lie in scaleability and relative ease of synthesis, respectively. Microfluidic synthesis utilizes continuous microreactors and microwave-assisted heating to integrate mixing, annealing, and shell coating and uses supercritical solvents to ensure uniform mass. Due to the scalability of this system, it has become a main method for production-scale manufacturing. In contrast, the heat-up method has the precursors mixed at room temperature and then heated. Due to the relatively simple set up this remains a predominant method of synthesis, but as nucleation and growth overlap, the resulting size uniformity is poor.

==== Nucleation and Growth Mechanisms ====
InP quantum dots experience high activation energy barriers for nucleation and growth due to the strong covalent bonding. In addition, InP formation can deviate from classical nucleation theory and LaMer burst nucleation. In classical nucleation theory, below the critical nucleus radius, seeds are unstable and rapidly redissolve. However, InP readily forms magic-sized clusters (MSCs) (~1 nm), kinetically persistent intermediate precursors with thermodynamically ultra-stable configurations, below this critical nucleus radius. InP QDs can also undergo slow, continuous nucleation occurring concurrently with nanoparticle growth instead of the rapid initial burst of nucleation that occurs in the LaMer model. In addition, the LaMer model assumes that growth is diffusion-limited but InP QD growth rates are governed by monomer attachment kinetics and are strongly size-dependent, with deceleration of growth occurring as size increases.

=== Defects and Passivation ===
Dangling bonds formed from 2- or 3-coordinated phosphorus and 2-coordinated indium surface atoms lead to the formation of hole and electron traps, respectively, thereby enabling non-radiative recombination via release of phonons.

Defects and trap states in the core InP quantum dot can lead to non-radiative recombination causing decreased photoluminescence quantum yield (PLQY), the measure of efficiency for converting absorbed to re-emitted light.This can be addressed through etching, passivation, and additions of shells. Due to the strong covalent bonds of InP, deep trap states with energies well within the band gap can occur. When surface atoms aren't fully coordinated such as a 2- or 3- coordinated surface P or 2-coordinated surface In, this creates hole and electron traps, respectively. This can lead to non-radiative recombination of electron/hole pair through release of phonons (vibrational energy) or red-shifted radiative recombination due to the smaller energy gap between the trap states. InP cores also oxidize easily resulting in surface oxide layers that can act as non-radiative recombination centers as well. Metal salts and halides (e.g. Zn carboxylate, Ga halides) can be used to passivate the surface to fill both under coordinated P and In sites, and etching with dilute HF or NH_{4}F removes surface oxide and P dangling bonds thereby boosting the PLQY. However, pre-etching cores prior to shell growth can result in less stable core/shell structures due to HF/NH_{4}F blocking the surface. The addition of shells is also used to passivate surface defects, raise the PLQY, and improve photo-stability.

=== Core-Shell Heterostructure ===
Type I core-shell heterostructures cause charge carriers to remain localized in the core, whereas type II core-shell heterostructures allow for charge carriers to delocalize into the shell, lowering the transition energy and red-shifting emission.

Shells added to reduce non-radiative recombination can also help shield the dot from environmental degradation, but depending on the materials and structure of the shell, it may modulate the emission wavelength and allow for delocalization of charge carriers into the shell itself. In type I heterostructures (e.g. InP/ZnS and InP/ZnSe), the electron and hole both stay in the core as the conduction and valence band of the core semiconductor lie entirely within the wider band gap of the shell material. Here emission wavelengths are governed predominantly by the starting core size and largely remain in the visible spectrum. In type II heterostructures (e.g. InP/ZnO, InP/CdS, and InP/CdSe), due to a staggered band alignment, it is possible for the hole to remain localized in the InP core while the electron delocalizes into the shell. Radiative recombination therefore may occur across the interface yielding an emission energy lower than the band gap of either individual component. In this condition, emission wavelengths depend on shell thickness, red-shifting into the NIR regime as the shell grows thicker and the quantum confinement relaxes. A lattice mismatch may also be present between the core and shell, something that occurs in InP/ZnS and InP/ZnSe systems, commonly used core-shell heterostructures. The lattice mismatch arises from the differing atomic spacing of the two layers making it difficult for the atoms at the interface to align. This creates structural strain and can lead to improperly bonded interfacial atoms, thereby decreasing the PLQY through an increase in trap states and defects. This can be mitigated by alloyed cores (incorporating zinc directly into the InP QD core), alloyed shells, intermediate buffer layers, composition gradients, and incorporation of cations at the surface junction.

=== Alloying and Doping ===
Alloying and the addition of metal dopants are employed to tune the band gap for emission of specific wavelengths of light as well as to suppress defects and improve the PLQY. Alloying the cores with cations, specifically Zn^{2+}, suppresses defects by passivating electron traps and reducing core/shell lattice mismatch as adsorbed cations can act as a transitional layer between the core and shell. When present during synthesis, cations can also alter growth kinetics by competing with In, altering reaction activation energy, lowering critical nucleation size, and preventing maturation and agglomeration of QDs via surface adsorption, thus enabling both size tuning and narrower size distributions.Additionally, alloying with smaller cations such as zinc and gallium can be used for emission wavelength tuning by contracting the lattice and widening the band gap, thereby favoring blue emission. Transition-metal doping (e.g. Cu, Mn, Ag) introduces dopant energy levels within the band gap such that recombination occurs through these dopant centers. This creates a large Stokes shift, the difference between emission and absorption energies, reduces self-absorption, and skews emission towards red-to-NIR.

=== Potential Applications ===
Due to the lower toxicity of InP quantum dots and properties of their emission spectra, researchers are currently investigating their potential in applications such as displays/lights, solar energy conversion, photocatalysis, and biomedical imaging and therapy but currently these applications remain largely in the research and development phase. For use in displays/lights, red and green InP QLEDs are approaching Cd-based devices in external quantum efficiency (EQE) values, the measure of a device's electrical response to light, but blue QLEDs lag in EQE values and experience poor stability. Blue QLEDs require large band gaps and tiny cores (<2nm), posing synthetic difficulties and increased sensitivity to defects. As the band gap widens and the conduction band rises, trap state energy levels remain fixed. These changes can cause electrons to leak into the shell and cause trap states to become "deeper" in the bandgap, both of which lower the PLQY, cause broadened and redshifted emission, and increase defect density. Complementarily, InP nanoparticles are also being explored for solar cells in both nanowire and QD forms. Large Stokes shifts acquired by doping or a type II heterostructure allows for reabsorption-free luminescent solar concentrators which decreases the loss of trapped light and increases current generated by the solar cell.

InP is also being studied for photocatalysis for which activity is primarily governed by interfacial charge transfer to surrounding acceptors through surface-localized electronic states rather than charge-transport routes taking place at edges of the conduction/valence bands. This photocatalytic activity is being studied for applications in environmental chemistry including H₂ evolution, CO₂ reduction, and nitrogen fixation. In addition, upon excitation, photo-generated electrons and holes can react with dissolved oxygen and water in order to produce reactive oxygen species which can be used to degrade toxic dyes and other pollutants, furthering research in environmental detoxification.

The relatively lower toxicity of InP QDs is especially notable in potential biomedical imaging and therapy applications. As InP QDs can emit in the NIR spectrum through introduction of defects, transition metal dopants, alloying, or type II heterostructure, this allows for visualization with deep tissue penetration, and they have been studied for use in lymph-node mapping and targeted cancer imaging via conjugated ligands. InP QDs are also being explored in resonance energy transfer (RET) biosensing to monitor cell and enzymatic activity, antimicrobial therapy through the generation of reactive oxygen species in response to NIR excitation, and photostimulation for retinal prostheses and neuronal stimulation. However, the protein corona, the coating of biomolecules on the surface of the nanoparticle, used for biological targeting can be adsorbed quickly, changing nanoparticle stability, identity, and target recognition while promoting ligand displacement and lattice degeneration. In addition, synthetic specificity of shells is critical for biological applications: in biological environments thin shells may allow partial solvent penetration and bare or degraded cores can oxidize and release In^{3+} while thicker shells may compromise colloidal stability. In addition, unmodified or poorly passivated QDs can stimulate protein adsorption, membrane damage, platelet aggregation, and thrombus formation, requiring PEGylation or zwitterionic coatings to suppress this.

== Cited sources ==
- Haynes, William M., ed. (2016). CRC Handbook of Chemistry and Physics (97th ed.). CRC Press. ISBN 9781498754293.
