= Carbon quantum dot =

Type of carbon nanoparticle

Carbon quantum dots also commonly called carbon nano dots or simply carbon dots (abbreviated as CQDs, C-dots or CDs) are carbon nanoparticles which are less than 10 nm in size and have some form of surface passivation.

== History ==
CQDs were first discovered by Xu et al. in 2004 accidentally during the purification of single-walled carbon nanotubes. This discovery triggered extensive studies to exploit the fluorescence properties of CQDs.

As a new class of fluorescent carbon nanomaterials, CQDs possess the attractive properties of high stability, good conductivity, low toxicity, environmental friendliness, simple synthetic routes as well as comparable optical properties to quantum dots. Carbon quantum dots have been extensively investigated especially due to their strong and tunable fluorescence emission properties, which enable their applications in biomedicine, optronics, catalysis, and sensing. In most cases CQDs emits the light in a band of about several hundred nanometers in visible or near-infrared range, however it was also reported on broadband CQDs covering the spectrum from 800 to 1600 nm.

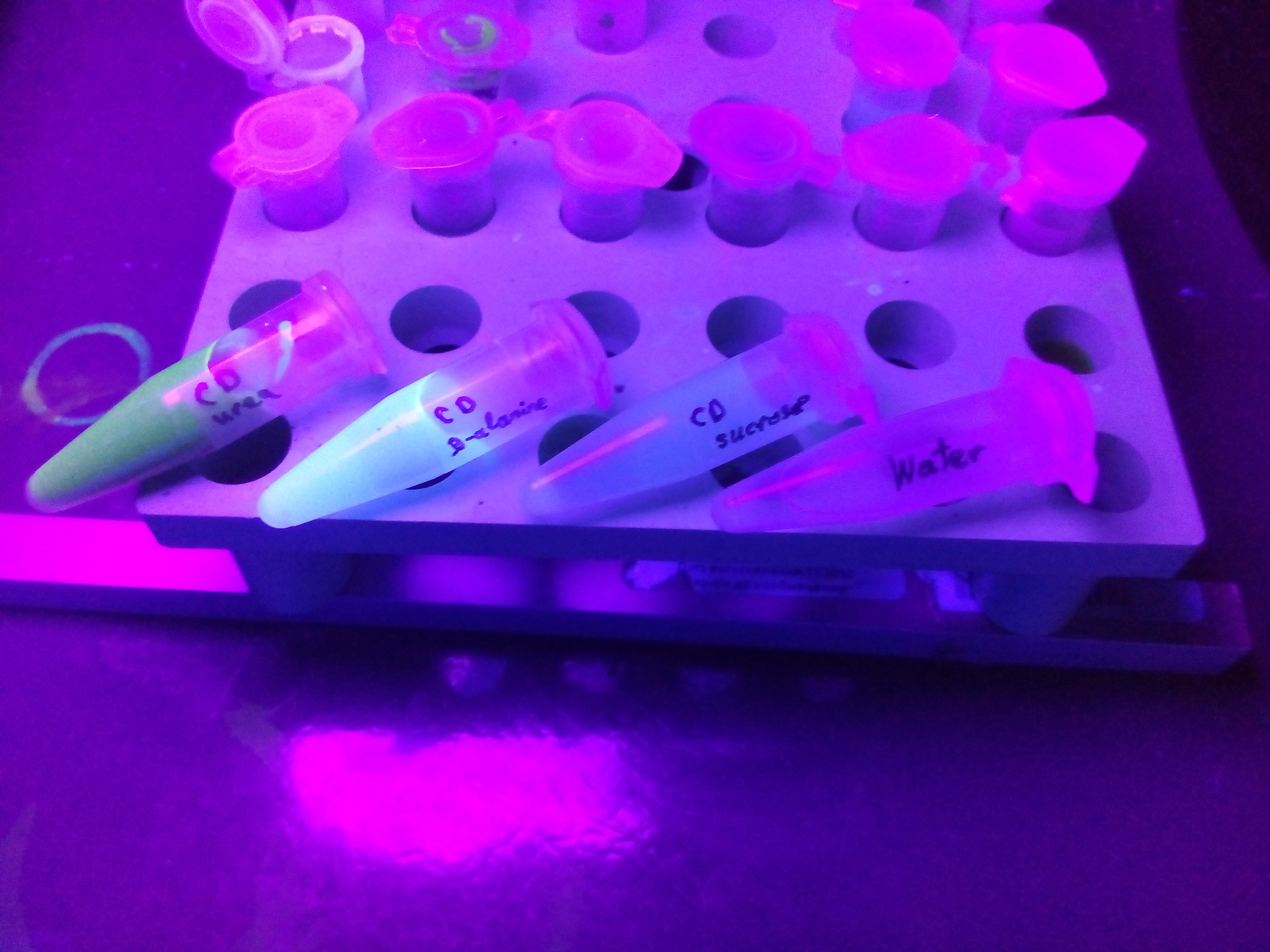
Carbon dots prepared from different precursors: urea, alanine and sucrose (made by Paliienko Konstantin)

The fundamental mechanisms responsible of the fluorescence capability of CQDs are very debated. Some authors have provided evidence of size-dependent fluorescence properties, suggesting that the emission arises from electronic transitions with the core of the dots, influenced by quantum confinement effects, whereas other works, including single particle measurements, have rather attributed the fluorescence to recombination of surface-trapped charges, or proposed a form of coupling between core and surface electronic states. The excitation-dependent fluorescence of CQDs, leading to their characteristic emission tunability, has been mostly linked to the inhomogeneous distribution of their emission characteristics, due to polydispersity, although some works have explained it as a violation of Kasha's rule arising from an unusually slow solvent relaxation.

== Properties ==
The structures and components of CQDs determine their diverse properties. Many carboxyl moieties on the CQD surface impart excellent solubility in water and biocompatibility. Such surface moieties enable CQDs to serve as proton conducting nanoparticles. CQDs are also suitable for chemical modification and surface passivation with various organic, polymeric, inorganic or biological materials. By surface passivation, the fluorescence properties as well as physical properties of CQDs are enhanced. Recently, it has been discovered that amine and hydroxamic acid functionalized CD can produce tricolor (green, yellow and red) emission when introduced with different pH environment and this tricolor emission can be preserved in ORMOSIL film matrix.

== Synthesis ==
Synthetic methods for CQDs are roughly divided into two categories, "top-down" and "bottom-up" routes. These can be achieved via chemical, electrochemical or physical techniques. The CQDs obtained could be optimized during preparation or post-treatment. Modification of CQDs is also very important to get good surface properties which are essential for solubility and selected applications.

=== Synthetic methods ===
"Top-down" synthetic route refers to breaking down larger carbon structures such as graphite, carbon nanotubes, and nanodiamonds into CQDs using laser ablation, arc discharge, and electrochemical techniques. For example, Zhou et al. first applied electrochemical method into synthesis of CQDs. They grew multi-walled carbon nanotubes on a carbon paper, then they inserted the carbon paper into an electrochemical cell containing supporting electrolyte including degassed acetonitrile and 0.1 M tetrabutyl ammonium perchlorate. Later, they applied this method in cutting CNTs or assembling CNTs into functional patterns which demonstrated the versatile callability of this method in carbon nanostructure manipulations.

"Bottom-up" synthetic route involves synthesizing CQDs from small precursors such as carbohydrates, citrate, and polymer-silica nanocomposites through hydrothermal/solvothermal treatment, supported synthetic, and microwave synthetic routes. For instance, Zhu et al. described a simple method of preparing CQDs by heating a solution of poly(ethylene glycol) (PEG) and saccharide in 500 W microwave oven for 2 to 10 min. By varying the molar ratio of citric acid and urea (two common precursor molecules) of the mixture that is subjected to pyrolysis, a number of distinct fluorescent materials in both liquid and solid state can be synthesised, predominantly comprising Carbon dots with embedded fluorophores. Also a laser-induced thermal shock method is exploited for synthesis ultra-broadband QCDs. Recently, green synthetic approaches have also been employed for fabrication of CQDs. Care must be taken to separate the "bottom-up" carbon dots from fluorescent byproducts such as small molecules or polyester condensates by using multiple dialysis and chromatography separation methods.

=== Size control ===
In addition to post-treatment, controlling the size of CQDs during the preparing process is also widely used. For instance, Zhu et al. reported hydrophilic CQDs through impregnation of citric acid precursor. After pyrolyzing CQDs at 300 °C for 2 hours in air, then removing silica, followed by dialysis, they prepared CQDs with a uniform size of 1.5–2.5 nm which showed low toxicity, excellent luminescence, good photostability, and up-conversion properties.

=== Modification ===
Being a new type of fluorescent nanoparticles, applications of CQD lie in the field of bioimaging and biosensing due to their biological and environmental friendly composition and excellent biocompatibility. In order to survive the competition with conventional semiconductor quantum dots, a high quantum yield should be achieved. Although a good example of CQDs with ~80% quantum yield was synthesized, most of the quantum dots synthesized have a quantum yield below 10% so far. Surface-passivation and doping methods for modifications are usually applied for improving quantum yield.

To prevent surfaces of CQDs from being polluted by their environment, surface passivation is performed to alleviate the detrimental influence of surface contamination on their optical properties. A thin insulating layer is formed to achieve surface passivation via the attachment of polymeric materials on CQDs surface treated by acid.

In addition to surface passivation, doping is also a common method used to tune the properties of CQDs. Various doping methods with elements such as N, S, P have been demonstrated for tuning the properties of CQDs, among which N doping is the most common way due to its great ability in improving the photo luminescence emissions. The mechanisms by which Nitrogen doping enhances the fluorescence quantum yield of CQDs, as well as the structure of heavily N-doped CDs, are very debated issues in the literature. Zhou et al. applied XANES and XEOL in investigating the electronic structure and luminescence mechanism in their electrochemically produced carbon QDS and found that N doping is almost certainly responsible for the blue luminescence. Synthesis of new nanocomposites based on CDs have been reported with unusual properties. For example, a nanocomposite has been designed by using of CDs and magnetic Fe_{3}O_{4} nanoparticles as precursors with nanozyme activity.

Post synthesis electrochemical etching results in dramatic changes in GQDs size and fluorescence intensity.

== Applications ==
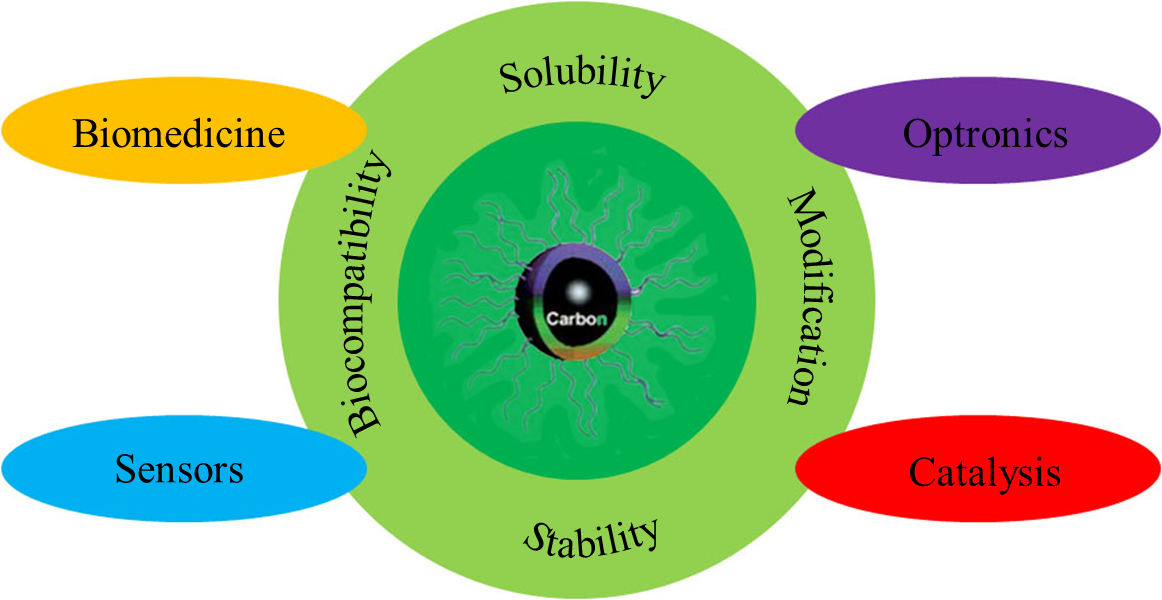
CQDs with unique properties have great potential in biomedicine, optronics, catalysis and sensors

=== Bioimaging ===
CQDs can be used for bioimaging due to their fluorescence emissions and biocompatibility. By injecting solvents containing CQDs into a living body, images in vivo can be obtained for detection or diagnosis purposes. One example is that organic dye-conjugated CQDs could be used as an effective fluorescent probes for H_{2}S. The presence of H_{2}S could tune the blue emission of the organic dye-conjugated CQDs to green. So by using a fluorescence microscope, the organic dye-conjugated CQDs were able to visualize changes in physiologically relevant levels of H_{2}S. Another example can be dual-mode bioimaging using their highly accessible surface functional groups to conjugate them via EDC-NHS chemistry. Saladino et al. demonstrated the concept using MW-assisted synthesized nitrogen-doped excitation-independent CQDs. These were conjugated with rhodium nanoparticles – X-ray fluorescence contrast agents – leading to dual-mode nanohybrids with both optical and X-ray fluorescent properties. Moreover, the conjugation process not only accounts for dual-mode bioimaging but also passivates the rhodium nanoparticle surface, resulting in reduced cytotoxicity.

=== Sensing ===
CQDs were also applied in biosensing as biosensor carriers for their flexibility in modification, high solubility in water, nontoxicity, good photostability, and excellent biocompatibility. The biosensors based on CQD and CQs-based materials could be used for visual monitoring of cellular copper, glucose, pH, trace levels of H_{2}O_{2} and nucleic acid. A general example is about nucleic acid lateral flow assays. The discriminating tags on the amplicons are recognized by their respective antibodies and fluorescence signals provided by the attached CQDs. More generally, the fluorescence of CQDs efficiently responds to pH, local polarity, and to the presence of metal ions in solution, which further expands their potential for nanosensing applications, for instance in the analysis of pollutants.

=== Drug delivery ===
The nontoxicity and biocompatibility of CQDs enable them with broad applications in biomedicine as drug carriers, fluorescent tracers as well as controlling drug release. This is exemplified by the use of CQDs as photosensitizers in photodynamic therapy to destroy cancer cells.

=== Catalysis ===
The flexibility of functionalization with various groups CQDs makes them possible to absorb lights of different wavelengths, which offers good opportunities for applications in photocatalysis. CQDs-modified P25 TiO_{2} composites exhibited improved photocatalytic H2 evolution under irradiation with UV-Vis. The CQDs serve as a reservoir for electrons to improve the efficiency of separating of the electron-hole pairs of P25. In the recent times, metal-free CQDs have been found to improve the kinetics of hydrogen evolution reaction (HER), making CQDs a sustainable choice for catalysis.

=== Optronics ===
CQDs possess the potential in serving as materials for dye-sensitized solar cells, organic solar cells, supercapacitors, and light emitting devices. CQDs can be used as photosensitizer in dye-sensitized solar cells and the photoelectric conversion efficiency is significantly enhanced. CQD incorporated hybrid silica based sol can be used as transparent Fluorescent paint,

=== Rocket fuels ===
Recently, CQDs have been employed in hybrid rocket fuels.

=== Fingerprint recovery ===
CQDs are used for the enhancement of latent fingerprints.

== See also ==
- Cadmium-free quantum dot
- Carbon nanotubes in photovoltaics
- Carbon nanotube quantum dot
- Graphene quantum dot
- Quantum dot
- Silicon quantum dot
