= Cadmium-free quantum dot =

Semiconductor nanoparticles

Quantum dots (QDs) are semiconductor nanoparticles with a size less than 10 nm. They exhibited size-dependent properties especially in the optical absorption and the photoluminescence (PL). Typically, the fluorescence emission peak of the QDs can be tuned by changing their diameters. So far, QDs were consisted of different group elements such as CdTe, CdSe, CdS in the II-VI category, InP or InAs in the III-V category, CuInS_{2} or AgInS_{2} in the I–III–VI_{2} category, and PbSe/PbS in the IV-VI category. These QDs are promising candidates as fluorescent labels in various biological applications such as bioimaging, biosensing and drug delivery.

However, most of the QDs in the commercial market are cadmium (Cd)-based QDs. Their potential toxicity in the biological environment has been debated over the past decade as the Cd^{2+} ions released from the QD surface are highly toxic to the cells and tissues. Thus, many researchers have focused on the development of cadmium-free quantum dots (CFQDs) in the 2010s.

== Applications ==
Doped ZnS/ZnSe QDs, graphene QDs and silicon QDs are novel CFQD types that have been demonstrated their low-toxicity and high colloidal and PL stability for in vitro and in vivo models. DNA/peptide-functionalized QDs have been widely used for targeted cell and tissue imaging and the monitoring of the drug delivery path. For example, various techniques are used for the Cd-free QDs imaging including confocal/multiphoton microscopy, CARS imaging. Through these techniques with Cd-free QDs as stable fluorescent labels, researchers can observe the cell and tissue structure with higher resolutions and in a much more biocompatible way. It is worth noting that these QDs are also flexible to conjugate with other agents such as metallic nanoparticles, radioactive labels and even Raman tags. Thus, multimodal imaging can be achieved with the multifunctional nanotags based on Cd-free QDs. Another useful application is to use these designed Cd-free QDs as nanoplatforms to do non-invasive therapeutics and diagnostics (i.e., theranostics). Recently, Cd-free QDs have also shown great potential in the fabrication of new generation of solar cells and display applications.

Quantum dots (QDs) have been a main focal point in the material science industry in the recent years, allowing scientists and engineers to manipulate and test the properties of these nanoscale particles to develop a better understanding of them. A wide variety of QDs are made from toxic heavy metals, like cadmium, which not only prohibits use in biological systems but also can be problematic in a general to a consumer buying a product composed of toxic metals. In order to combat this, researchers have been developing QDs that are not composed of these metals, such as cadmium-free QDs. The medical field has been constantly evolving in an attempt to master the unknown about diseases, such as cancer. Much is unknown about cancer and most treatment routines includes chemotherapy, where toxic chemicals are flushed throughout the body in order to kill the cancer cells. This viscous treatment has been claiming lives for years and researchers have been heavily studying alternatives to this pathway. This is where Cd-free QDs come into play. Michael Sailor and his team including National Science Foundation (NSF)- supported researched at University of California, San Diego (UCSD), have developed the first nanoscale Cd-free QD that is able to glow brightly enough to allow physicians to examine internal organs. This image can last long enough to release cancer drugs before breaking down into harmless by-products. Silicon wafers were used, this way when they were broken down in the body, silicic acid is formed which is already present in the body which is needed for proper bone and tissue growth.

== Examples ==
Zinc sulfide
One type of material that is used as an alternative to quantum dots that contain cadmium and other heavy metals are zinc type quantum dots. Sulfur, oxygen, and selenium are often attached to the zinc component for the final quantum dots. A very interesting use of zinc sulfide quantum dots is the detection of food toxins including the harmful toxin, aflatoxin- B1. Aflatoxin B1 is a very toxic compound that can cause serious and permanent harm to the human body including liver failure. Another use for the zinc sulfide quantum dot involves the pure zinc sulfide quantum dot to remove naphthalene by the use of photocatalytic methodology. In this specific experiment a zinc sulfide quantum dot was used to photodegrade the molecule naphthalene which was used as a model to describe industrial pollutant molecules. Another application of this technique involves using zinc sulfide quantum dots to treat industrial waste water.
Indium
An alternative to the heavy metal quantum dots are quantum dots that contain Indium. One example is the use of CuInS2 quantum dots as fluorescent labels that emit light in the near infrared region of the visible spectrum. In this specific experiment these CuInS2 nanoparticles were placed inside of silica beads. Studies including the cytotoxicity and photoluminescence were performed. Due to the high quantum yield obtained (30–50 percent), low overall toxicity, and the overall stability of the particles in solution lead to the conclusion that cells could be imaged using synthetic particles. An additional application of the CuInS2 quantum dots involved the drug delivery of an anticancer drug named doxorubicin (DOX). In this experiment the CuInS2 quantum dots were capped with L-cysteine. The anticancer drug was released by the fluorescent quenching of the synthesized quantum dots which additionally provided images of the cancer cells while the drug was being released. Results obtained from the experiment were positive with low toxic effects on the cells from the quantum dots, and good activity from the anticancer drug.
Another type of quantum dot composed of indium is the InP quantum dot. Due to the lower photoluminescent intensity and the lower quantum yield of InP they are coated with a material with a larger band gap like ZnS.
One application with InP quantum dots coated with zinc sulfide involved the creation of LED with tunable photo luminescent emissions. Fabrication of the quantum dot LED involved a blue chip as a blue light source and a silicon resin containing the quantum dots on top of the chip creating the sample, with good results obtained from the experiment.
Silicon
A third type of quantum dot that does not contain heavy metals is the silicon quantum dot. These silicon quantum dots can be used in numerous situations which include photochemical and biological applications such as the use of silicon layers for photovoltaic applications. In an experiment using silicon quantum dots near the interface of the substrate and the quantum dots, the power conversion efficiency of the solar cell increased. Silicon quantum dots can also be used as optical labels and drug delivery detection systems, in addition to being used detect formaldehyde in water. The silicon quantum dots emitted stable fluorescence over pH values (2–14) and exhibited strong tolerance to salt and additional reagents. Detection involving formaldehyde quenching the fluorescence of the water soluble silicon dots showing the application of silicon quantum dots involving biochemical detection.

== See also ==
- Carbon quantum dot
- Carbon nanotube quantum dot
- Graphene quantum dot
- Indium phosphide quantum dot
- Nanocrystal solar cell
- Nanoparticle
- Quantum dot
