= Carbon nanotube quantum dot =

Region in carbon nanotube

A carbon nanotube quantum dot (CNT QD) is a small region of a carbon nanotube in which electrons are confined.

== Formation ==
A CNT QD is formed when electrons are confined to a small region within a carbon nanotube. This is normally accomplished by application of a voltage to a gate electrode, dragging the valence band of the CNT down in energy, thereby causing electrons to pool in a region in the vicinity of the electrode. Experimentally this is accomplished by laying a CNT on a silicon dioxide surface, sitting on a doped silicon wafer. This can be done by chemical vapor deposition using carbon monoxide. The silicon wafer serves as the gate electrode. Metallic leads can then be laid over the nanotube in order to connect the CNT QD up to an electrical circuit.

== Electronic structure ==
The CNT QD has interesting properties as a result of the strong correlation between the confined electrons. In addition to this the electrons possess orbital angular momentum, as is characteristic of CNT electrons. spin–orbit coupling has also been shown to be significant in these systems. These properties are often probed by connecting the nanotube to two metallic leads and measuring the conductance of the system.

== Many-body systems ==
The CNT QD connected to metallic leads constitutes a genuine many-body system, due to the electron correlations. Therefore, Wilson's Numerical renormalization group is often used to study the CNT QD. The CNT QD is modelled as an Anderson-type model, which can be reduced by Schrieffer-Wolff transformation to an effective Kondo-type model at low temperature.

== Other nanotube system ==
Similar mesoscopic devices have been constructed from elements other than carbon. So called copper nanotubes (CuNTs), developed by the Chinese Academy of Sciences, are fabricated by closely aligning individual copper atoms on a surface.

== See also ==
- Cadmium-free quantum dot
- Carbon nanotube
- Carbon quantum dot
- Graphene quantum dot
- Optical properties of carbon nanotubes
