= Photothermal effect =

Electromagnetic radiation phenomenon

Photothermal effect is a phenomenon associated with electromagnetic radiation. It is produced by the photoexcitation of material, resulting in the production of thermal energy (heat).

It is sometimes used during treatment of blood vessel lesions, laser resurfacing, laser hair removal and laser surgery.
