= Graphene quantum dot =

Graphene nanoparticle with a size less than 100nm

Graphene quantum dots (GQDs) are graphene nanoparticles with a size less than 100 nm. Due to their exceptional properties such as low toxicity, stable photoluminescence, chemical stability and pronounced quantum confinement effect, GQDs are considered as a novel material for biological, opto-electronics, energy and environmental applications.

== Properties ==
Graphene quantum dots (GQDs) consist of one or a few layers of graphene and are smaller than 100 nm in size. They are chemically and physically stable, have a large surface to mass ratio and can be dispersed in water easily due to functional groups at the edges. The fluorescence emission of GQDs can extend across a broad spectral range, including the UV, visible, and IR. The origin of GQD fluorescence emission is a subject of debate, as it has been related to quantum confinement effects, defect states and functional groups that might depend on the pH, when GQDs are dispersed in water. Their electronic structure depends sensitively on the crystallographic orientation of their edges, for example zigzag-edge GQDs with 7-8 nm diameter show a metallic behavior. In general, their energy gap decreases, when the number of graphene layers or the number of carbon atoms per graphene layer is increased.

== Health and safety ==
The toxicity of graphene-family nanoparticles is a matter of ongoing research. The toxicity (both in vivo and cytotoxicity) of GQDs are related to a variety of factors including particle size, methods of synthesis, chemical doping and so on. Many authors claim, that GQDs are biocompatible and cause only low toxicity as they are just composed of organic materials, which should lead to an advantage over semiconductor quantum dots. Several in vitro studies, based on cell cultures, show only marginal effects of GQDs on the viability of human cells. An in-depth look at the gene expression changes caused by GQDs with a size of 3 nm revealed that only one, namely the selenoprotein W, 1 out of 20 800 gene expressions was affected significantly in primary human hematopoietic stem cells. On the contrary, other in vitro studies observe a distinct decrease of cell viability and the induction of autophagy after exposure of the cells to GQDs and one in vivo study in zebrafish larvae observed the alteration of 2116 gene expressions. These inconsistent findings may be attributed to the diversity of the used GQDs, as the related toxicity is dependent on particle size, surface functional groups, oxygen content, surface charges and impurities. Currently, the literature is insufficient to draw conclusions about the potential hazards of GQDs.

== Preparation ==
Presently, a range of techniques have been developed to prepare GQDs. These methods are normally classified into two groups: top-down and bottom-up. Top-down approaches apply different techniques to cut bulk graphitic materials into GQDs including graphite, graphene, carbon nanotubes, coal, carbon black and carbon fibres. These techniques mainly include electron beam lithography, chemical synthesis, electrochemical preparation, graphene oxide (GO) reduction, C60 catalytic transformation, the microwave assisted hydrothermal method (MAH), the Soft-Template method, the hydrothermal method, and the ultrasonic exfoliation method. Top-down methods usually need intense purification as strong mixed acids are used in these methods. On the other hand, bottom-up methods assemble GQDs from small organic molecules such as citric acid and glucose. These GQDs have better biocompatibility.

== Application ==
Graphene quantum dots are studied as an advanced multifunctional material due to their unique optical, electronic, spin, and photoelectric properties induced by the quantum confinement effect and edge effect. They have possible applications in treatment of Alzheimer's disease, bioimaging, photothermal therapy, temperature sensing, drug delivery, LEDs lighter converters, photodetectors, OPV solar cells, and photoluminescent material, biosensors fabrication.

== See also ==
- Cadmium-free quantum dot
- Carbon quantum dot
- Carbon nanotube quantum dot
