= Luminescent solar concentrator =

Device for concentrating solar radiation using luminescence

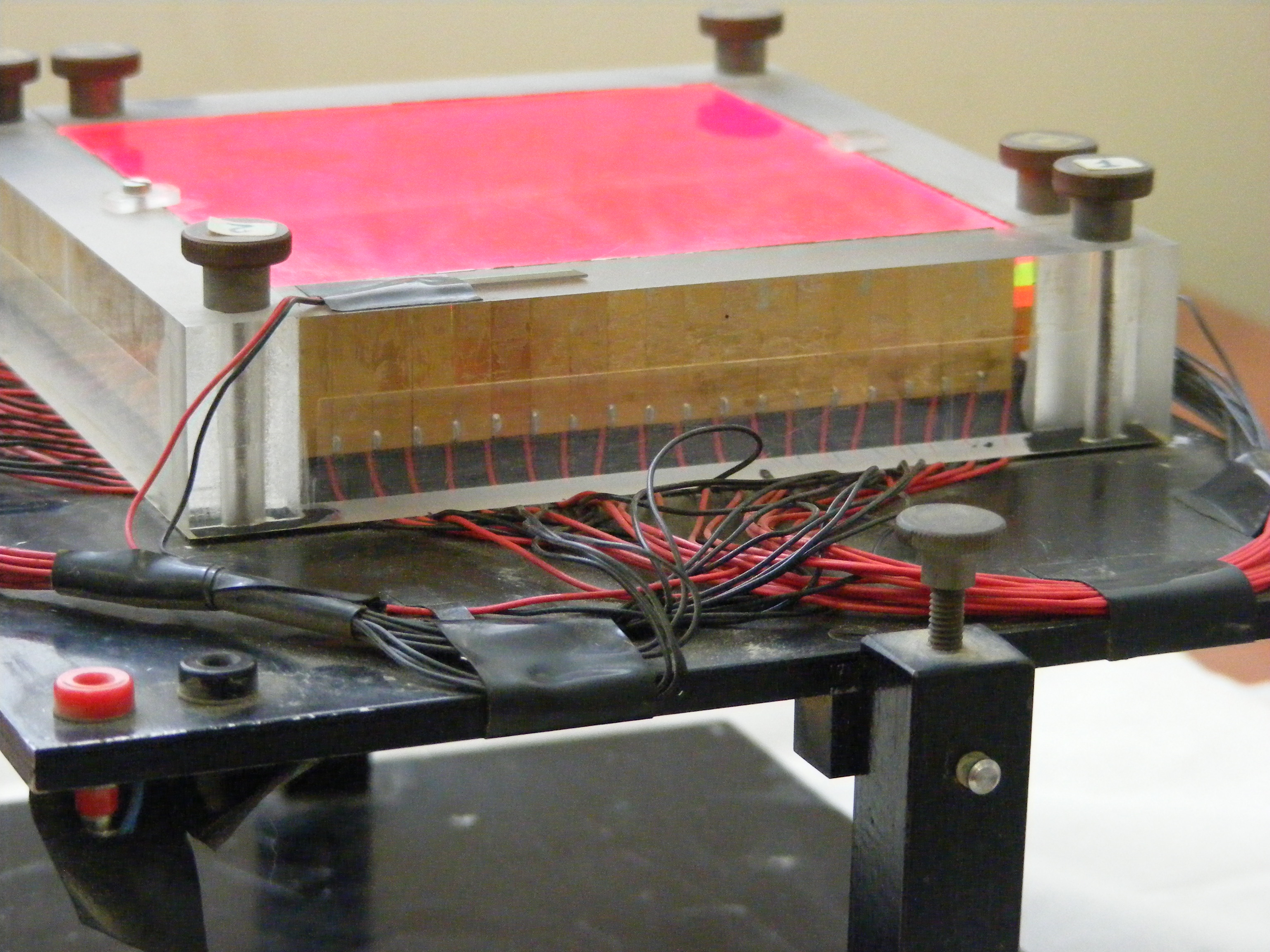
A luminescent solar concentrator

A luminescent solar concentrator (LSC) is a device for concentrating radiation, solar radiation in particular, to produce electricity. Luminescent solar concentrators operate on the principle of collecting radiation over a large area, converting it by luminescence (specifically by fluorescence) and directing the generated radiation into relatively small photovoltaic solar cells at the edges.

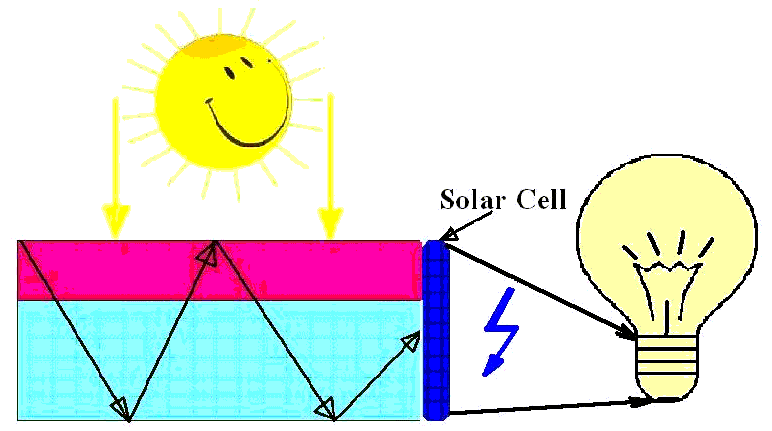
LSC scheme diagram

== Design ==
Initial designs typically comprised parallel thin, flat layers of alternating luminescent and transparent materials, placed to gather incoming radiation on their (broader) faces and emit concentrated radiation around their (narrower) edges. Commonly the device would direct the concentrated radiation onto solar cells to generate electric power.

Other configurations (such as doped or coated optical fibers, or contoured stacks of alternating layers) may better fit particular applications.

== Structure and principles of operation ==
The layers in the stack may be separate parallel plates or alternating strata in a solid structure. In principle, if the effective input area is sufficiently large relative to the effective output area, the output would be of correspondingly higher irradiance than the input, as measured in watts per square metre. The concentration factor is the ratio between output and input irradiance of the whole device.

For example, imagine a square glass sheet (or stack) 200 mm on a side, 5 mm thick. Its input area (e.g. the surface of one single face of the sheet oriented toward the energy source) is 10 times greater than the output area (e.g. the surface of four open sides) - 40000 square mm (200x200) as compared to 4000 square mm (200x5x4). To a first approximation, the concentration factor of such an LSC is proportional to the area of the input surfaces divided by the area of the edges multiplied by the efficiency of diversion of incoming light towards the output area. Suppose that the glass sheet could divert incoming light from the face towards the edges with an efficiency of 50%. The hypothetical sheet of glass in our example would give an output irradiance of light 5 times greater than that of the incident light, producing a concentration factor of 5.

Similarly, a graded refractive index optic fibre 1 square mm in cross section, and 1 metre long, with a luminescent coating might prove useful.

=== Concentration factor versus efficiency ===
The concentration factor interacts with the efficiency of the device to determine overall output.

- The concentration factor is the ratio between the incoming and emitted irradiance. If the input irradiance is 1 kW/m2 and the output irradiance is 10 kW/m2, that would provide a concentration factor of 10.
- The efficiency is the ratio between the incoming radiant flux (measured in watts) and the outgoing wattage, or the fraction of the incoming energy that the device can deliver as usable output energy (not the same as light or electricity, some of which might not be usable). In the previous example, half the received wattage is re-emitted, implying efficiency of 50%.

Most devices (such as solar cells) for converting the incoming energy to useful output are relatively small and costly, and they work best at converting directional light at high intensities and a narrow frequency range, whereas input radiation tends to be at diffuse frequencies, of relatively low irradiance and saturation. Concentration of the input energy accordingly is one option for efficiency and economy.

=== Luminescence ===
The above description covers a wider class of concentrators (for example simple optical concentrators) than just luminescent solar concentrators. The essential attribute of LSCs is that they incorporate luminescent materials that absorb incoming light with a wide frequency range, and re-emit the energy in the form of light in a narrow frequency range. The narrower the frequency range, (i.e. the higher the saturation) the simpler a photovoltaic cell can be designed to convert it to electricity.

Suitable optical designs trap light emitted by the luminescent material in all directions, redirecting it so that little escapes the photovoltaic converters. Redirection techniques include internal reflection, refractive index gradients and where suitable, diffraction. In principle such LSCs can use light from cloudy skies and similar diffuse sources that are of little use for powering conventional solar cells or for concentration by conventional optical reflectors or refractive devices.

The luminescent component might be a dopant in the material of some or all of the transparent medium, or it might be in the form of luminescent thin films on the surfaces of some of the transparent components.

== Theory of luminescent solar concentrators ==
Various articles have discussed the theory of internal reflection of fluorescent light so as to provide concentrated emission at the edges, both for doped glasses and for organic dyes incorporated into bulk polymers. When transparent plates are doped with fluorescent materials, effective design requires that the dopants should absorb most of the solar spectrum, re-emitting most of the absorbed energy as long-wave luminescence. In turn, the fluorescent components should be transparent to the emitted wavelengths. Meeting those conditions allows the transparent matrix to convey the radiation to the output area. Control of the internal path of the luminescence could rely on repeated internal reflection of the fluorescent light, and refraction in a medium with a graded refractive index.

Theoretically about 75-80 % of the luminescence could be trapped by total internal reflection in a plate with a refractive index roughly equal to that of typical window glass. Somewhat better efficiency could be achieved by using materials with higher refractive indices. Such an arrangement using a device with a high concentration factor should offer impressive economies in the investment in photovoltaic cells to produce a given amount of electricity. Under ideal conditions the calculated overall efficiency of such a system, in the sense of the amount of energy leaving the photovoltaic cell divided by the energy falling on the plate, should be about 20%.

This takes into account:

- the absorption of light by poorly transparent materials in the transparent medium,
- the efficiency of light conversion by the luminescent components,
- the escape of luminescence beyond the critical angle and
- gross efficiency (which is the ratio of the average energy emitted to the average energy absorbed).

== Practical prospects and challenges ==
The relative merits of various functional components and configurations are major concerns, in particular:

- Organic dyes offer wider ranges of frequencies and more flexibility in choice of frequencies emitted and re-absorbed than rare earth compounds and other inorganic luminescent agents.
- Doping organic polymers is generally practical with organic luminescent agents, whereas doping with stable inorganic luminescent agents usually is not practical except in inorganic glasses.
- Luminescent agents configured as bulk doping of a transparent medium have merits that differ from those of thin films deposited on a clear medium.
- Various trapping media present varying combinations of durability, transparency, compatibility with other materials and refractive index. Inorganic glass and organic polymer media comprise the two main classes of interest.
- Photonic systems create band gaps that trap radiation.
- Identifying materials that re-emit more input light as useful luminescence with negligible self-absorption is crucial. Attainment of that ideal depends on tuning the relevant electronic excitation energy levels to differ from the emission levels in the luminescent medium.
- Alternatively the luminescent materials can be configured into thin films that emit light into transparent passive media that can efficiently conduct towards the output.
- The sensitivity of solar cells must match the maximal emission spectrum of the luminescent colorants.
- Increase the probability of transition from the ground state to the excited state of surface plasmons increases efficiency.

Luminescent solar concentrators could be used to integrate solar-harvesting devices into building façades in cities.

== Advances ==
=== Transparent luminescent solar concentrators ===
In 2013, researchers at Michigan State University demonstrated the first visibly transparent luminescent solar concentrators. These devices were composed of phosphorescent metal halide nanocluster (or Quantum dot) blends that exhibit massive Stokes shift (or downconversion) and which selectively absorb ultraviolet and emit near-infrared light, allowing for selective harvesting, improved reabsorption efficiency, and non-tinted transparency in the visible spectrum. The following year, these researchers demonstrated near-infrared harvesting visibly transparent luminescent solar concentrators by utilizing luminescent organic salt derivatives. These devices exhibit a clear visible transparency similar to that of glass and a power conversion efficiency close to 0.5%. In this configuration efficiencies of over 10% are possible due to the large fraction of photon flux in the near-infrared spectrum.

=== Quantum dots ===
LSCs based on cadmium selenide/zinc sulfide (CdSe/ZnS) and cadmium selenide/cadmium sulfide (CdSe/CdS) quantum dots (QD) with induced large separation between emission and absorption bands (called a large Stokes shift) were announced in 2007 and 2014 respectively. As of 2018, indium phosphide quantum dots are also being studied as a cadmium-free alternative, due to heavy metal toxicity and the fact that they can also be engineered to possess a large Stokes shift.

Light absorption is dominated by an ultra-thick outer shell of CdS, while emission occurs from the inner core of a narrower-gap CdSe. The separation of light-absorption and light-emission functions between the two parts of the nanostructure results in a large spectral shift of emission with respect to absorption, which greatly reduces re-absorption losses. The QDs were incorporated into large slabs (sized in tens of centimeters) of poly(methyl methacrylate) (PMMA). The active particles were about one hundred angstroms across.

Spectroscopic measurements indicated virtually no re-absorption losses on distances of tens of centimeters. Photon harvesting efficiencies were approximately 10%. Despite their high transparency, the fabricated structures showed significant enhancement of solar flux with the concentration factor of more than four.

== See also ==
- Concentrated photovoltaics
- Solar cells
- Solar cell research
- Surface plasmons
- Thin films
