= Solvothermal synthesis =

Method of producing chemical compounds

Schematic diagram of solvothermal synthesis setup: (1) stainless steel autoclave (2) precursor solution (3) Teflon liner (4) stainless steel lid (5) spring

Solvothermal synthesis is a method of producing chemical compounds, in which a solvent containing reagents is put under high pressure and temperature in an autoclave. Many substances dissolve better in the same solvent in such conditions than at standard conditions, enabling reactions that would not otherwise occur and leading to new compounds or polymorphs. Solvothermal synthesis is very similar to the hydrothermal route; both are typically conducted in a stainless steel autoclave. The only difference being that the precursor solution is usually non-aqueous.

Solvothermal synthesis has been used prepare MOFs, titanium dioxide, and graphene, carbon spheres, chalcogenides and other materials.

== Solvents ==
Besides water (hydrothermal synthesis), solvothermal syntheses make use of a large range of solvents, including ammonia, carbon dioxide, dimethylformamide, and various alcohols such as methanol, or glycols such as hexane-1,6-diol.

=== Formic acid as reaction medium ===
Formic acid decomposes at high temperatures to carbon dioxide and hydrogen or carbon monoxide and water. This property allows formic acid to be used as a reducing and carbon dioxide-rich reaction medium in which it is possible to form various oxides and carbonates.

=== Ammonia as reaction medium ===
The critical temperature and pressure of ammonia are 132.2 °C and 111 bar. In these conditions, it is possible to obtain a range of amides, imides, and nitrides. Although its dielectric constant is lower than that of water, ammonia behaves as a polar solvent especially at high pressures.
