= Biological imaging =

Biological imaging may refer to any imaging technique used in biology. Typical examples include:

- Bioluminescence imaging, a technique for studying laboratory animals using luminescent protein
- Calcium imaging, determining the calcium status of a tissue using fluorescent light
- Diffuse optical imaging, using near-infrared light to generate images of the body
- Diffusion-weighted imaging, a type of MRI that uses water diffusion
- Fluorescence lifetime imaging, using the decay rate of a fluorescent sample
- Gallium imaging, a nuclear medicine method for the detection of infections and cancers
- Imaging agent, a chemical designed to allow clinicians to determine whether a mass is benign or malignant
- Imaging studies, which includes many medical imaging techniques
- Magnetic resonance imaging (MRI), a non-invasive method to render images of living tissues
- Magneto-acousto-electrical tomography (MAET), is an imaging modality to image the electrical conductivity of biological tissues
- Medical imaging, creating images of the human body or parts of it, to diagnose or examine disease
- Microscopy, creating images of objects or features too small to be detectable by the naked human eye
- Molecular imaging, used to study molecular pathways inside organisms
- Non-contact thermography, is the field of thermography that derives diagnostic indications from infrared images of the human body.
- Nuclear medicine, uses administered radioactive substances to create images of internal organs and their function.
- Optical imaging, using light as an investigational tool for biological research and medical diagnosis
- Optoacoustic imaging, using the photothermal effect, for the accuracy of spectroscopy with the depth resolution of ultrasound
- Photoacoustic Imaging, a technique to detect vascular disease and cancer using non-ionizing laser pulses
- Ultrasound imaging, using very high frequency sound to visualize muscles and internal organs
