= Environmental testing =

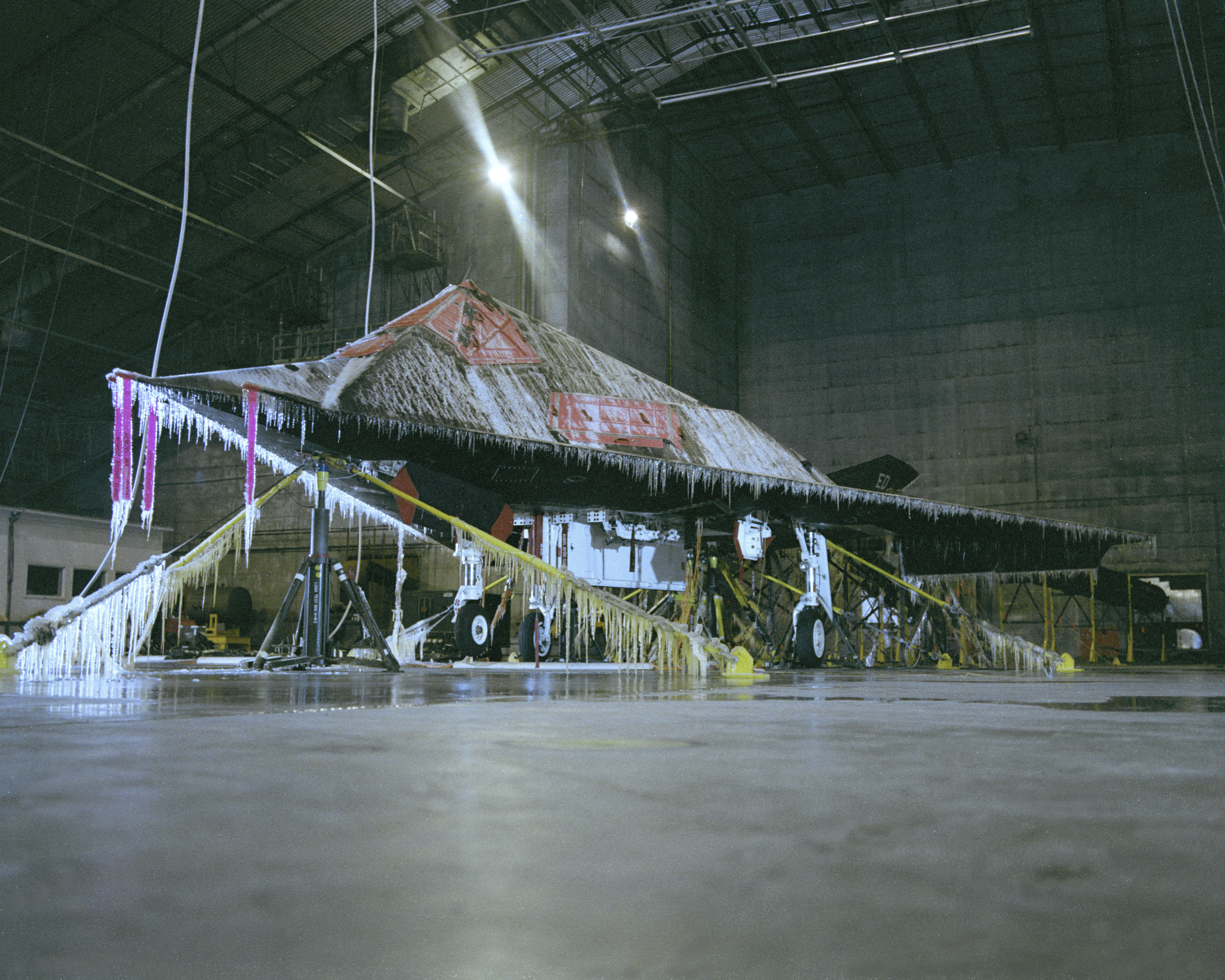
A Lockheed F-117 Nighthawk fighter aircraft being tested for exposure to cold temperatures at the McKinley Climatic Laboratory

Environmental testing is the measurement of the performance of equipment under specified environmental conditions. This can include the following:

- High and low extreme temperatures
- Temperature cycling
- Sand and dust exposure
- Salt spray
- High and low humidity
- Wet environments
- Deep water submersion
- Corrosive material exposure
- Algae and microbial exposure
- Shock and vibrations, including gun fire
- High and low pressure
- Pressure cycling
- Electromagnetic interference

Such tests are most commonly performed on equipment used in military, maritime, aeronautical and space applications.

== Standards ==
Environmental test standards include:

- MIL-STD-810
- MIL-HDBK-2036
- IEC 60068
- IEC 60945
- RTCA DO-160
- MIL-STD-461

== See also ==
- Environmental stress screening
- Environmental test chambers
- Direct Field Acoustic Testing
- Technischer Überwachungsverein
