= Environmental stress screening =

Type of hardware test

Environmental stress screening (ESS) refers to the process of exposing a newly manufactured or repaired product or component (typically electronic) to stresses such as thermal cycling and vibration in order to force latent defects to manifest themselves by permanent or catastrophic failure during the screening process. The surviving population, upon completion of screening, can be assumed to have a higher reliability than a similar unscreened population.

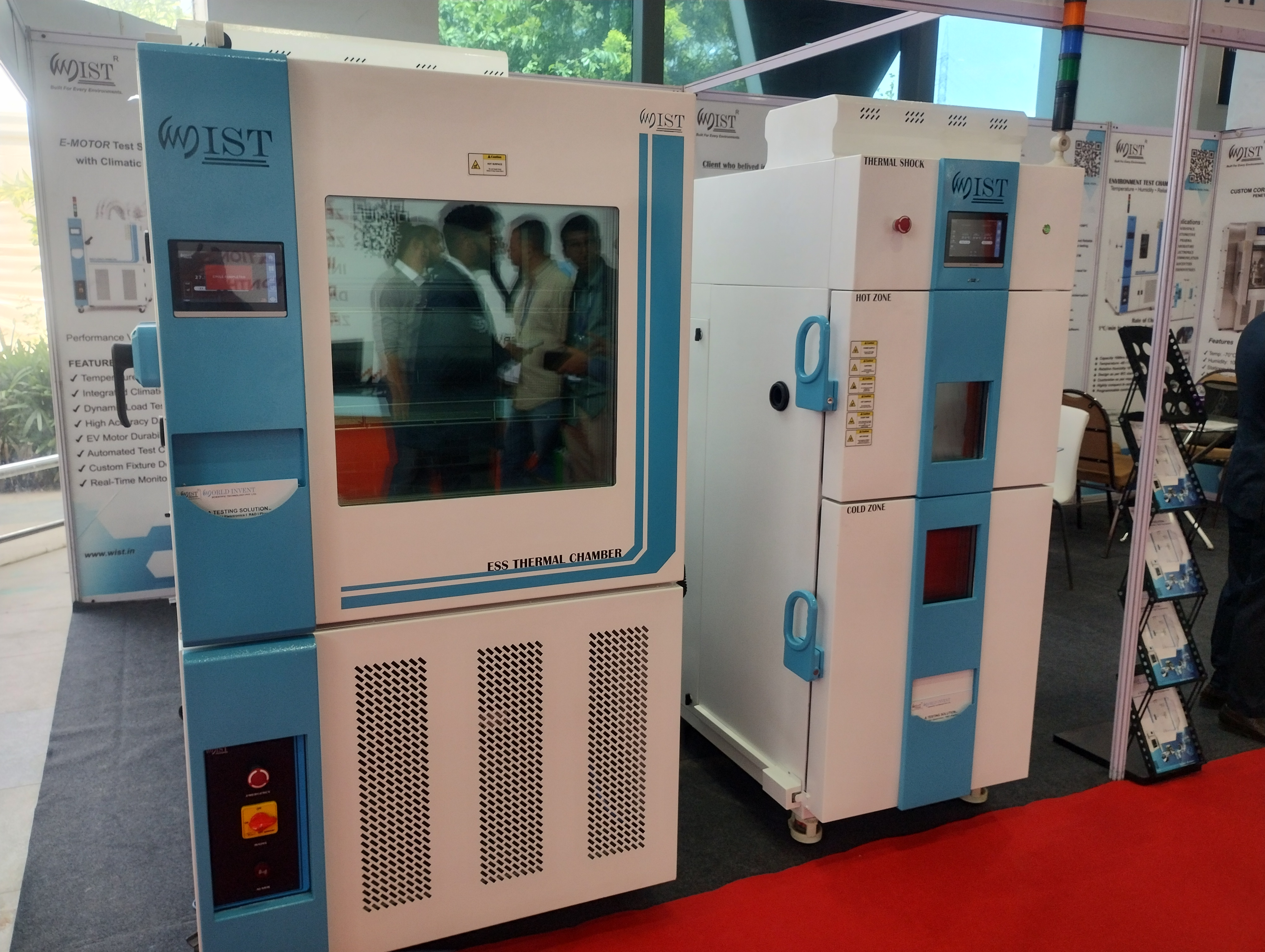
An environmental stress screening test system at DEF-TECH Bharat 2026, KTPO, Bengaluru

== Overview ==
Developed to help electronics manufacturers detect product defects and production flaws, ESS is widely used in military and aerospace applications, less so for commercial products. The tests need not be elaborate, for example, switching an electronic or electrical system on and off a few times may be enough to catch some simple defects that would otherwise be encountered by the end user very soon after the product was first used. Tests typically include the following:

- Temperature variations
- Vibration tests
- Pressure
- Flexibility tests

ESS can be performed as part of the manufacturing process or it can be used in new product qualification testing.

An ESS system usually consists of a test chamber, controller, fixturing, interconnect and wiring, and a functional tester. These systems can be purchased from a variety of companies in the environmental test industry.

The stress screening from this process will help find infant mortality in the product. Finding these failures before the product reaches the customer yields better quality and lower warranty expenses. Associated military terminology includes an operational requirements document (ORD) and ongoing reliability testing (ORT).

== Standardized Definitions and Methods ==
The following is extracted from a paper on ESS testing prepared by the U.S. Air Force to provide standardized definitions and methods.

=== Introduction ===
The purpose of this paper is to provide standardized definitions and a roadmap of test processes for the Environmental Stress Screening (ESS) of replacement and repaired components used on Air Force systems. The term “component” is used interchangeably with the term “unit” and includes Line-replaceable unit (LRU) and sub-units (SRU). A component selected for testing is a Unit Under Test (UUT). Operational Safety, Suitability, and Effectiveness (OSS&E) policy and instructions require consistency in the disciplined engineering process used to ensure that activities such as maintenance repairs and part substitutions do not degrade system or end-item baselined characteristics over their operational life. Baselined characteristics are highly dependent on reliability, which is verified and maintained by ESS testing. OSS&E policy and instructions also require consistent engineering processes to ensure manufacturing and repair entities are accountable for delivering quality products, and to provide selection and qualification criteria for new sources of supply. Determinations of product quality and source capabilities usually require ESS testing. While considerable information concerning ESS methods and procedures is available including United States Military Standards, handbooks, guides, and the original equipment manufacturer's test plans, often these publications use differing and confusing definitions for the testing phases where ESS is applied. Lengthy explanations were needed to clarify contract clauses citing these publications. This paper ensures testing requirements are uniformly applied and clearly understood in writing source qualification requirements and contracts.

=== Visual Inspection ===
==== Purpose ====
To ensure that good workmanship has been employed and that the UUT is free of obvious physical defects.

==== Method ====
Visually inspect UUT before and after each manufacturing, repair, and test operation.

- Verify proper labeling, weight, and dimensions.
- With the unaided eye, inspect all accessible areas of the UUT.
- Under 10X minimum magnification, inspect all critical surfaces and interfaces of the UUT.

==== Pass/Fail Criteria ====
Workmanship shall meet the applicable standards including T.O. 00-25-234 and shall be free of obvious physical defects. A unit that exhibits any sign that a part is stressed beyond its design limit (cracked circuit boards, loose connectors and/or screws, bent clamps and/or screws, worn parts, etc.) is considered to have failed even if the UUT passes the Functional Testing.

=== Functional Testing ===
==== Purpose ====
Done before, during, and after ESS testing to verify that the UUT is functioning within design tolerances.

==== Method ====
Applying an input signal or stimulus and measuring the output.

==== Pass/Fail Criteria ====
Output responses/signals must be within technical data specifications, and the UUT must operate satisfactorily in the next higher assembly.

=== Environmental Stress Screening (ESS) ===
==== Purpose ====
Testing at the physical environmental conditions (shock, vibration, temperature, altitude, humidity, etc.) that simulate those encountered over the operational life of the component. Random vibration and temperature cycling have proven to be the most successful forms of ESS in terms of effective flaw precipitation.

==== Method ====
A stress profile is developed and applied to the UUT. The profile simulates the environmental conditions encountered during transportation, storage, handling, and operational use phases. The UUT is configured to match the phase, e.g. transportation shocks are applied with the UUT in the shipping container, operational use temperature cycles are applied with the UUT operating.

==== Pass/Fail Criteria ====
The UUT (Unit Under Test) must pass Functional Testing and Visual Inspection before, during, and after ESS.

=== Qualification ESS ===
The testing of a production-representative unit to demonstrate that the design, manufacturing, assembly, and repair processes have resulted in hardware that conforms to the specification. Satisfactory completion of Qualification Testing denotes readiness for further stages of testing. Limited flight testing may be acceptable before completion of all phases of Qualification Testing.

==== Production Unit Qualification Testing ====
- Purpose: Done for qualification of a new manufacturer, design, process, or facility to ensure the adequacy and suitability of the design to reliably operate during and after exposure to environmental stresses that exceed operational environment predictions by a prescribed margin.
- Method: Per Mil-Std-810G for LRUs and SRUs, per Mil-Std-202G for electronic piece parts, per Mil-Std-1540 for space systems, and per Mil-Std-883H for microelectronic devices. EMI/RFI Testing is usually included in ESS Qualification Testing and requires application of MIL-STD 461E. These Military Standards require tailoring. Mil-HDBKs-340, 343, 344 and 2164 provide detailed guidance. Sequence of First Production Article testing: Visual Inspection and Functional – Preconditioning – Acceptance ESS – Acceptance Reliability – Visual Inspection & Functional – Qualification ESS – Visual Inspection & Functional –Qualification Reliability – Visual Inspection & Functional.
- Note: Qualification Testing usually includes ‘aggravated’ ESS testing, i.e. test to actual environmental levels and duration plus a margin (typically 10 °C, 6 dB). Adding margin is required due to the statistically small sample size and uncertainties in actual environmental levels. Since this is a destructive test, the UUT shall never be fielded in operational systems.
- Note: Must do Acceptance Testing including Pre-Conditioning first. This is because these tests are done on all production units and so become parts of the environmental stress profile.
- Note: Another manufacturer (second-source) building the same unit or a replacement unit that is intended as a form-fit-and-function replacement for the original unit or unit sub-assembly must be qualified to specifications equivalent to those used for the original source.

==== Repaired Unit Qualification Testing ====
- Purpose: Performed on First Repaired Article or Pre-Qualification Repaired Article units to qualify a new repair source or repair method. It is also performed to evaluate substitute piece parts.
- Method: If the repair parts and processes are equivalent to the original manufacturing parts and processes, then use the Repaired Unit Acceptance Test performed by the contractor, followed by Government inspection and operation in the next higher assembly. If the parts and processes are not known to be equivalent, then use applicable areas of the Production Unit Qualification Testing. Sequence of PreQual Repaired Article / First Repaired Article testing: Visual Inspection & Functional – Preconditioning – Acceptance ESS – Visual Inspection & Functional – Gov't Inspection & Functional.
- Note: Due to Diminishing Manufacturing Sources (DMS), substitutions of piece parts are often necessary. Substitute parts that appear under ambient test bench conditions to function like the original parts can exhibit unsatisfactory performance in the operational environment.
- Qualification by Similarity. Qualification of a replacement or repaired unit by similarity to the original unit requires that the units are essentially identical. In addition, the replacement unit must have previously been qualified by testing to environmental and operational performance requirements meeting or exceeding the environmental and operational requirements of the original unit.

=== Acceptance ESS ===
Formal tests conducted to demonstrate acceptability of the individual unit for delivery. They demonstrate performance to purchase specification requirements and act as quality control screens to detect deficiencies of workmanship and materials. The successful completion of such tests denotes acceptance of the unit by the procurement agency.

==== Production Unit Acceptance Testing ====
- Purpose: Done on 100% of new units to detect workmanship and process errors. Inspection of some microelectronic devices is destructive so lot sampling is used for acceptance testing (see paragraph 8.3.2).
- Method: Tailored down from applicable Production Qualification Test but done to workmanship levels, no more severe than actual environmental levels and of shortened duration. Usually these tests are structured to include the Pre-Conditioning and Reliability Acceptance Testing requirements. Sequence for Components testing: Visual Inspection & Functional – Preconditioning – Acceptance ESS – Acceptance Reliability – Visual Inspection & Functional.
- Note: Production Unit Acceptance Testing performance data is also used to evaluate "in-family" performance. While a UUT may meet all other Acceptance Test pass/fail criteria, results which deviate significantly from other units within the production lot shall require rejection of that unit.

=== Repaired Unit Acceptance Testing ===
- Purpose: Performed on 100% of repaired units to detect workmanship and process errors.
- Method: Tailored down from applicable Production Acceptance Tests. To maintain the specified reliability criteria, Pre-Conditioning Testing should be included if the repair parts are not pre-conditioned or the repair workmanship can be expected to induce failures. Sequence for Components testing: Visual Inspection & Functional – Preconditioning – Acceptance ESS – Visual Inspection & Functional.
- Note: Test levels are low and not destructive so testing may be repeated for test failures and subsequent repairs without significantly aging the UUT.
- Note: Types and levels of testing may have to be increased if infant mortality failures are occurring in operational use. Conversely, if a statistically significant sampling demonstrates that infant mortality failures are not occurring, ESS tests may be reduced or eliminated. Functional Testing is still required.
- Note: Testing must strike a balance between the probability that the repairs have induced a defect, and the probability that the testing can detect that defect. For example, a reduced number of temperature cycles has a lower probability of detecting a defect, but may be appropriate if the repair is minor and has little risk of inducing a defect.
- Note: Repaired Unit Acceptance Testing performance data is also used to evaluate "in-family" performance. While a UUT may meet all other Acceptance Test pass/fail criteria, results which deviate significantly from other repaired units or from the original Production Unit Acceptance Test data shall require rejection of the UUT.

=== Reliability ESS ===
This should be part of the Qualification and Acceptance ESS when verification of reliability is required.

==== Reliability Qualification Testing ====
- Purpose: Done on the production qualification UUT to demonstrate life-cycle compliance with the reliability specifications per Mil-Std-781, and the original manufacturer's development specifications.
- Method: Use Mil-Hdbk-781A. The UUT is usually tested to actual environmental levels, but margin is added if accelerated aging is required.
- Note: Must do Acceptance Testing including Pre-Conditioning first. This is because these tests are done on all production units and so become parts of the environmental stress profile.
- Note: The presence of redundancy in the design is not reason to eliminate reliability tests. Redundancy is used to compensate for any unknown and untested failure modes, and for damage tolerance. Redundancy only increases reliability by a small amount.

==== Reliability Acceptance Testing ====
- Purpose: Done on all production units to find any unit with reliability degradation due to daily variations in the production process and workmanship.
- Method: Vibration (typically 0.04 G2/Hz for 5 minutes/axis) and temperature for 3+ cycles, last one failure-free.
- Note: Usually only done on high reliability (3-sigma) and safety of flight items.

==== Pre-Conditioning Testing. Also called Burn-In Testing ====
- Purpose: Done on all active unit LRUs, SRUs, and piece parts (production, spare, and repair) to find ‘infant mortality’ of parts and workmanship.
- Method: per Mil-Std-750D, Mil-Std-883E, and Mil-Std-202G.
- Note: Most mil-spec piece parts have not been pre-conditioned by the part manufacturer.

=== UUT Categories ===
==== Passive Unit ====
- Examples: chassis, antenna coupler, optics without moving parts, wiring harness.
- Note: Requires Qualification ESS of the design and processes, usually in the next higher assembly. Acceptance Testing is limited to Visual Inspection and Operational Testing in the next higher assembly.

==== Active Unit ====
- Examples: PC board with solid state devices, electric motor, cathode ray tube, pressure vessel.
- Note: Usually requires Qualification ESS and Acceptance ESS.

==== One-Shot and Limited Use Devices ====
- Examples: explosive, rocket propellant, gas generator, squib, battery.
- Method: Qualification ESS is by exposure to qualification environmental levels, then operated to demonstrate capacity plus a margin. Acceptance ESS is typically done on 10% of the production lot (but not less than 10 units) by exposure to qualification environmental levels, then operated to demonstrate capacity plus a margin. Failure of one UUT requires rejection of the production lot. For explosive devices, test requirements and methods are tailored from MIL-HDBK-1512 and NATO AOP-7. For batteries, guidance on test requirements is in RCC-Doc-319-99.
- Note: Surveillance Testing is a periodic repeat of the Acceptance Testing using trending or accelerated aging to authorize shelf life extensions. Trending involves frequent sampling and comparison to previous results to predict degradation. Accelerated aging involves stimulating known failure modes to detect degradation.

==== First Production Article ====
This is the UUT for Qualification ESS (typically three UUT are required). The UUT must be representative of the design, production line processes, materials, and workmanship.

==== First Repaired Article ====
Also called First Article. This is the UUT (typically four are required) that demonstrates that the repair source has the capability and processes to perform a satisfactory repair.

==== Pre-Qualification Article ====
- Pre-Qualification Production Article. Also called Pre-production Article. This is the UUT used for program risk reduction and to qualify key processes, technologies, etc.
- Pre-Qualification Repaired Article. Also called Qual Article. This is the UUT (typically two are required) repaired by a potential repair contractor to meet, in part, the criteria to be on a Qualified Bidders List.

== Tailoring ==
Tailoring is the formal engineering task of using existing technical data (requirements, standards, specifications, test plans, etc.) and selecting or modifying applicable areas to meet the requirements unique to the type of unit undergoing test. Non-applicable requirements are deleted. Other requirements may be added due to changes in Federal standards, identification of new hazards, modifications to the item, or changes in the mission/ESS profile. All areas of non-compliance with the technical data shall be identified by the contractor and a Requirements Tailoring Request (RTR) shall be submitted to the Government for each area. The RTR shall include thorough justification. Only the Government Engineering Authority for the component can accept an RTR.

=== Specifications and Standards Tailoring ===
Tailoring generally is to select the applicable areas, best test methods, or for use of an equivalent requirement.

=== Test Plan Tailoring ===
Tailoring generally is to change the test levels and durations, sequence of tests, or reporting requirements. Tailoring shall also identify any test requirements that are to be accomplished through analysis, similarity, or inspection.

=== MIC, Waiver, and Deviation ===
Each RTR shall be classified as a MIC, Waiver, or Deviation.

- MIC. An RTR that still meets the intent of the specified technical data is classified as a Meets Intent Compliance (MIC).
- Waiver. If an RTR potentially increases the safety hazards, it is classified as a Waiver and must also be accepted by the cognizant Government and contractor safety offices. The intent of a Waiver is to grant temporary approval to proceed while the hazard is being corrected. A series of unlikely, unrelated simultaneous failures is not considered a hazard.
- Deviation. An RTR that does not increase safety hazards and is not a MIC is classified as a Deviation.

== Relevant standards ==
- "MIL-HDBK-781A, MILITARY HANDBOOK, RELIABILITY TEST METHODS, PLANS, AND ENVIRONMENTS FOR ENGINEERING, DEVELOPMENT QUALIFICATION, AND PRODUCTION" (PDF). United States Department of Defense. 28 Feb 2006.
- "MIL-STD-202G, MILITARY STANDARD, TEST METHOD STANDARD, ELECTRONIC AND ELECTRICAL COMPONENT PARTS" (PDF). United States Department of Defense. 8 Feb 2002.
- "MIL-HDBK-344A, MILITARY HANDBOOK: ENVIRONMENTAL STRESS SCREENING (ESS) OF ELECTRONIC EQUIPMENT" (PDF). United States Department of Defense. 16 Aug 1993.
- "MIL-HDBK-505, DEPARTMENT OF DEFENSE HANDBOOK FOR DEFINITIONS OF ITEM LEVELS, ITEM EXCHANGEABILITY, MODELS, AND RELATED TERMS" (PDF). United States Department of Defense. 12 Feb 1998.
- "MIL-STD-781D, MILITARY STANDARD, RELIABILITY TESTING FOR ENGINEERING DEVELOPMENT, QUALIFICATION, AND PRODUCTION (S/S BY MIL-HDBK-781A)" (PDF). United States Department of Defense. 17 Oct 1986.
- "MIL-STD-810G, DEPARTMENT OF DEFENSE TEST METHOD STANDARD, ENVIRONMENTAL ENGINEERING CONSIDERATIONS AND LABORATORY TESTS" (PDF). United States Department of Defense. 31 Oct 2008.
- "MIL-STD-883G, DEPARTMENT OF DEFENSE TEST METHOD STANDARD: MICROCIRCUITS" (PDF). United States Department of Defense. 28 Feb 2006.
- "IEST-RP-PR001: MANAGEMENT AND TECHNICAL GUIDELINES FOR THE ESS PROCESS" (Website). IEST. 25 Feb 2015.

== See also ==
- Accelerated aging
- Environmental chamber
- Environmental tests
- Failure analysis
- United States Military Standard
- MIL-STD-810 "Department of Defense Test Method Standard for Environmental Engineering Considerations and Laboratory Tests"
- Highly accelerated stress screen
- Highly accelerated life test
