= FQA =

FQA may refer to:

- Final quality audit, the last process flow before shipping a product
- Floristic Quality Assessment, a tool used to assess an area's ecological integrity
- FQA, the ICAO code for Quikjet Airlines, Bangalore, India
