= IEC 60068 =

Standard for testing electrotechnical products

IEC 60068 is an international standard for the environmental testing of electrotechnical products that is published by the International Electrotechnical Commission (IEC).

IEC 60068 is a collection of methods for environmental testing of electronic equipment and products to assess their ability to perform under environmental conditions including extreme cold and dry heat. IEC 60068 offers appropriate severities and prescribes various environmental conditions for measurements and tests.

IEC 60068 has three parts:

- IEC 60068-1: General and guidance
- IEC 60068-2: Tests
- IEC 60068-3: Supporting documentation and guidance

== Tests ==
Some of the tests have been withdrawn, replaced, or merged with other documents or standards.
IEC 60068-2-1 - Test A: Cold
IEC 60068-2-2 - Test B: Dry heat
IEC 60068-2-5 - Test S: Simulated solar radiation at ground level and guidance for solar radiation testing and weathering
IEC 60068-2-6 - Test Fc: Vibration (sinusoidal)
IEC 60068-2-7 - Test Ga and guidance: Acceleration, steady state
IEC 60068-2-10 - Test J and guidance: Mould growth
IEC 60068-2-11 - Test Ka: Salt mist
IEC 60068-2-13 - Test M: Low air pressure
IEC 60068-2-14 - Test N: Change of temperature
IEC 60068-2-17 - Test Q: Sealing
IEC 60068-2-18 - Test R and guidance: Water
IEC 60068-2-20 - Test Ta and Tb: Test methods for solderability and resistance to soldering heat of devices with leads
IEC 60068-2-21 - Test U: Robustness of terminations and integral mounting devices
IEC 60068-2-27 - Test Ea and guidance: Shock
IEC 60068-2-30 - Test Db: Damp heat, cyclic (12 h + 12 h cycle)
IEC 60068-2-31 - Test Ec: Rough handling shocks, primarily for equipment-type specimens
IEC 60068-2-32 - Test Ed: Free Fall (withdrawn)
IEC 60068-2-38 - Test Z/AD: Composite temperature/humidity cyclic test
IEC 60068-2-39 - Tests and guidance: Combined temperature or temperature and humidity with low air pressure tests
IEC 60068-2-42 - Test Kc: Sulphur dioxide test for contacts and connections
IEC 60068-2-43 - Test Kd: Hydrogen sulphide test for contacts and connections
IEC 60068-2-45 - Test XA and guidance: Immersion in cleaning solvents
IEC 60068-2-46 - Guidance to test Kd: Hydrogen sulphide test for contacts and connections
IEC 60068-2-47 - Mounting of specimens for vibration, impact and similar dynamic tests
IEC 60068-2-49 - Guidance to test Kc: Sulphur dioxide test for contacts and connections
IEC 60068-2-52 - Test Kb: Salt mist, cyclic (sodium chloride solution)
IEC 60068-2-53 - Combined climatic (temperature/humidity) and dynamic (vibration/shock) tests
IEC 60068-2-55 - Test Ee and guidance - Loose cargo testing including bounce
IEC 60068-2-57 - Test Ff: Vibration - Time-history and sine-beat method
IEC 60068-2-58 - Test Td: Test methods for solderability, resistance to dissolution of metallization and to soldering heat of surface mounting devices (SMD)
IEC 60068-2-60 - Test Ke: Flowing mixed gas corrosion test
IEC 60068-2-61 - Test Z/ABDM:Climatic sequence
IEC 60068-2-64 - Test Fh: Vibration, broadband random and guidance
IEC 60068-2-65 - Test Fg: Vibration - Acoustically induced method
IEC 60068-2-66 - Test Cx: Damp heat, steady state (unsaturated pressurized vapour)
IEC 60068-2-67 - Test Cy: Damp heat, steady state, accelerated test primarily intended for components
IEC 60068-2-68 - Test L: Dust and sand
IEC 60068-2-69 - Test Te/Tc: Solderability testing of electronic components and printed boards by the wetting balance (force measurement) method
IEC 60068-2-70 - Test Xb: Abrasion of markings and letterings caused by rubbing of fingers and hands
IEC 60068-2-74 - Test Xc: Fluid contamination
IEC 60068-2-75 - Test Eh: Hammer tests
IEC 60068-2-77 - Test 77: Body strength and impact shock
IEC 60068-2-78 - Test Cab: Damp heat, steady state
IEC 60068-2-80 - Test Fi: Vibration - Mixed mode
IEC 60068-2-81 - Test Ei: Shock - Shock response spectrum synthesis
IEC 60068-2-82 - Test Xw1: Whisker test methods for components and parts used in electronic assemblies
IEC 60068-2-83 - Test Tf: Solderability testing of electronic components for surface mounting devices (SMD) by the wetting balance method using solder paste
IEC 60068-2-85 - Test Fj: Vibration - Long time history replication

== Supporting documentation and guidance ==
IEC 60068-3-1 - Cold and dry heat tests
IEC 60068-3-3 - Seismic test methods for equipment
IEC 60068-3-4 - Damp heat tests
IEC 60068-3-5 - Confirmation of the performance of temperature chambers
IEC 60068-3-6 - Confirmation of the performance of temperature/ humidity chambers
IEC 60068-3-7 - Measurements in temperature chambers for tests A (Cold) and B (Dry heat) (with load)
IEC 60068-3-8 - Selecting amongst vibration tests
IEC 60068-3-11 - Calculation of uncertainty of conditions in climatic test chambers
IEC TR 60068-3-12 - Method to evaluate a possible lead-free solder reflow temperature profile
IEC 60068-3-13 - Supporting documentation and guidance on Test T - Soldering

== Other supporting documentation and guidance ==
IEC 60068-5-2 - Guide to drafting of test methods - Terms and definitions

== See also ==
- List of International Electrotechnical Commission standards
- MIL-STD-810, "Test Method Standard for Environmental Engineering Considerations and Laboratory Tests"
- MIL-HDBK-2036, "Preparation of Electronic Equipment Specifications"
- IEC 60945, "Maritime navigation and radiocommunication equipment and systems – General requirements – Methods of testing and required test results"
- RTCA DO-160, "Environmental Conditions and Test Procedures for Airborne Equipment"
- MIL-STD-461, "Department of Defense Interface Standard: Requirements for the Control of Electromagnetic Interference Characteristics of Subsystems and Equipment"
