= John Gridunov =

Soviet space equipment tester (1926–2015)

John Ivanovich Gridunov (Russian: Джон Иванович Гридунов; 6 October 1926 – 12 August 2015) was a Russian engineer in the Soviet space program, working as to validate tests for the former Soviet spacecraft equipment. Being the so-called ground cosmonaut, Gridunov conducted several environmental tests, including the explosive decompression while testing a space suit. He is the only person to experience a short-time acceleration of 50 g (490 m/s^{2}), during an emergency landing imitation.

Gridunov also sustained a 19 g (190 m/s^{2}) centrifuge acceleration in the spine-chest direction without related accommodation.

== Life ==
John Gridunov was born in Serhetabat, then Kushka, Turkmenian SSR and named after American writer and activist John Reed. In the birth certificate Gridunov was recorded as John (Reed), in brackets. In 1941 Gridunov entered the Voroshilovgrad Air Force Academy. During the Second World War, he served as a mechanic in Soviet 999th, 58th and 80th Air Regiments. Though Gridunov never received a degree in engineering, he finished the Serpukhov Air Mechanics Military Academy in 1944. In November 1949–April 1950 he was a student of Zhukovsky Air Force Engineering Academy.

Gridunov joined the group of spacecraft equipment testers when the Soviet 1st Astronaut Group was formed. Lately Gridunov explained, why he took up the job: "I thought down here on Earth I could contribute to making their [cosmonauts'] flights more secure". For ten years Gridunov has been in the secret group of the ground cosmonauts, but officially was in charge of the club at the Moscow Institute of Aviation and Space Medicine. In 1965 Gridunov tested the possible emergencies of the imitated Moon flight. During the eight days in a vacuum hypobaric chamber, directly after the high-g training, Gridunov faced the artificial heat and the lack of oxygen while testing the temperature control system. During the imitated Moon flight Gridunov was appointed the commander of a three-person crew, but turned the only one to complete the test and received 1,000 roubles. He also investigated the human capability during an emergency landing in cold water (−4 °C (25 °F)) and in heat (60 °C (140 °F)) with a limited amount of water, food and medicines.

During the touch-down after a 12-meter (39 ft) free fall on lead cylinders, Gridunov experienced a record acceleration of 50 g (490 m/s^{2}), which broke the related device. He recalls that episode as follows: "I heard them [engineers] command me: “Attention!” “Ready!” These are normally followed by the “Drop!” command. But that time they delayed the command for some reason, and I bent aside from the seat a little. The stroke pressure was so huge that I had a buzzing in my head for another three days".

Despite never being on a real space mission, Gridunov had friendly relationships with cosmonauts (particularly with Vladimir Komarov and Pavel Popovich) and spent holidays with them. Once summarizing, Gridunov said: "Cosmonauts overcame distance, conquered space. I was overcoming myself, conquered my own inner space." He died in August 2015 at the age of 88.
