= Accelerated aging =

Product testing method

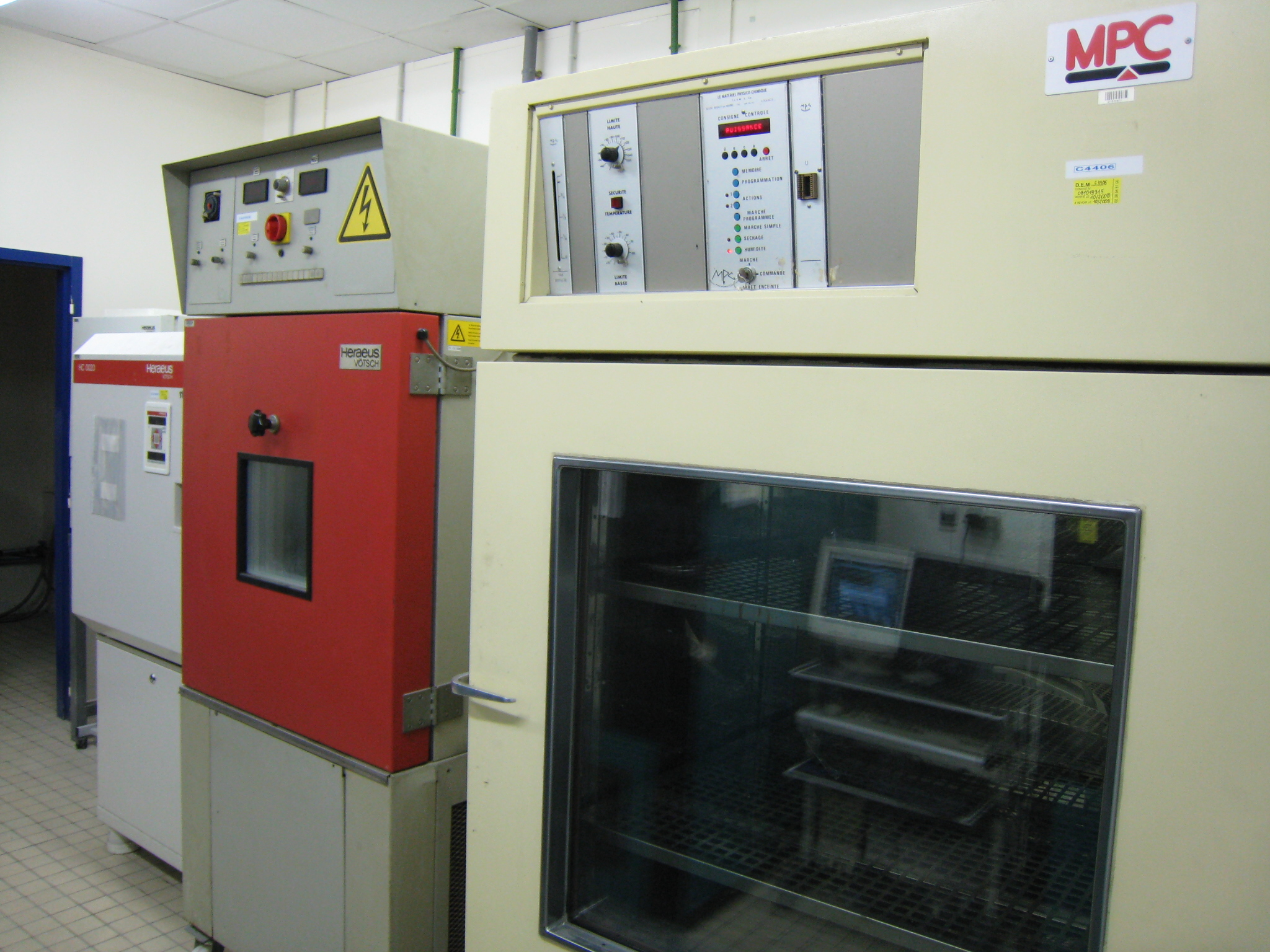
A climatic chamber, used in accelerated aging

Accelerated aging is testing that uses aggravated conditions of heat, humidity, oxygen, sunlight, vibration, etc. to speed up the normal aging processes of items. It is used to help determine the long-term effects of expected levels of stress within a shorter time, usually in a laboratory by controlled standard test methods. It is used to estimate the useful lifespan of a product or its shelf life when actual lifespan data is unavailable. This occurs with products that have not existed long enough to have gone through their useful lifespan: for example, a new type of car engine or a new polymer for replacement joints.

Physical testing or chemical testing is carried out by subjecting the product to

- representative levels of stress for long time periods,
- unusually high levels of stress used to accelerate the effects of natural aging, or
- levels of stress that intentionally force failures (for further analysis).

Mechanical parts are run at very high speed, far in excess of what they would receive in normal usage. Polymers are often kept at elevated temperatures, in order to accelerate chemical breakdown. Environmental chambers are often used.

Also, the device or material under test can be exposed to rapid (but controlled) changes in temperature, humidity, pressure, strain, etc. For example, cycles of heat and cold can simulate the effect of day and night for a few hours or minutes.

== Library and archival preservation science ==
Accelerated aging is also used in library and archival preservation science. In this context, a material, usually paper, is subjected to extreme conditions in an effort to speed up the natural aging process. Usually, the extreme conditions consist of elevated temperature, but tests making use of concentrated pollutants or intense light also exist. These tests may be used for several purposes.

- To predict the long-term effects of particular conservation treatments. In such a test, treated and untreated papers are both subjected to a single set of fixed, standardized conditions. The two are then compared in an effort to determine whether the treatment has a positive or negative effect on the lifespan of the paper.
- To study the basic processes of paper decay. In such a test, the purpose is not to predict a particular outcome for a specific type of paper, but rather to gain a greater understanding of the chemical mechanisms of decay.
- To predict the lifespan of a particular type of paper. In such a test, paper samples are generally subjected to several elevated temperatures and a constant level of relative humidity equivalent to the relative humidity in which they would be stored. The researcher then measures a relevant quality of the samples, such as folding endurance, at each temperature. This allows the researcher to determine how many days at each temperature it takes for a particular level of degradation to be reached. From the data collected, the researcher extrapolates the rate at which the samples might decay at lower temperatures, such as those at which the paper would be stored under normal conditions. In theory, this allows the researcher to predict the lifespan of the paper. This test is based on the Arrhenius equation. This type of test is, however, a subject of frequent criticism.

There is no single recommended set of conditions at which these tests should be performed. In fact, temperatures from 22 to 160 degrees Celsius, relative humidities from 1% to 100%, and test durations from one hour to 180 days have all been used. ISO 5630-3 recommends accelerated aging at 80 degrees Celsius and 65% relative humidity when using a fixed set of conditions.

Besides variations in the conditions to which the papers are subjected, there are also multiple ways in which the test can be set up. For instance, rather than simply placing single sheets in a climate controlled chamber, the Library of Congress recommends sealing samples in an air-tight glass tube and aging the papers in stacks, which more closely resembles the way in which they are likely to age under normal circumstances, rather than in single sheets.

=== Criticisms ===
Accelerated aging techniques, particularly those using the Arrhenius equation, have frequently been criticized in recent decades. While some researchers claim that the Arrhenius equation can be used to quantitatively predict the lifespan of tested papers, other researchers disagree. Many argue that this method cannot predict an exact lifespan for the tested papers, but that it can be used to rank papers by permanence. A few researchers claim that even such rankings can be deceptive, and that these types of accelerated aging tests can only be used to determine whether a particular treatment or paper quality has a positive or negative effect on the paper's permanence.

There are several reasons for this skepticism. One argument is that entirely different chemical processes take place at higher temperatures than at lower temperatures, which means the accelerated aging process and natural aging process are not parallel. Another is that paper is a "complex system" and the Arrhenius equation only applicable to elementary reactions. Other researchers criticize the ways in which deterioration is measured during these experiments. Some point out that there is no standard point at which a paper is considered unusable for library and archival purposes. Others claim that the degree of correlation between macroscopic, mechanical properties of paper and molecular, chemical deterioration has not been convincingly proven. Reservations about the utility of this method in the automotive industry as a method for assessing corrosion performance have been documented

In an effort to improve the quality of accelerated aging tests, some researchers have begun comparing materials which have undergone accelerated aging to materials which have undergone natural aging. The Library of Congress, for instance, began a long-term experiment in 2000 to compare artificially aged materials to materials allowed to undergo natural aging for a hundred years.

=== History ===
The technique of artificially accelerating the deterioration of paper through heat was known by 1899, when it was described by W. Herzberg. Accelerated aging was further refined during the 1920s, with tests using sunlight and elevated temperatures being used to rank the permanence of various papers in the United States and Sweden. In 1929, a frequently used method in which 72 hours at 100 degrees Celsius is considered equivalent to 18–25 years of natural aging was established by R. H. Rasch.

In the 1950s, researchers began to question the validity of accelerated aging tests which relied on dry heat and a single temperature, pointing out that relative humidity affects the chemical processes which produce paper degradation and that the reactions which cause degradation have different activation energies. This led researchers like Baer and Lindström to advocate accelerated aging techniques using the Arrhenius equation and a realistic relative humidity.

== See also ==
- Arrhenius equation
- Environmental stress screening
- Environmental chamber
- Highly Accelerated Life Test
- Planned obsolescence
