= DO-160 =

Standard for environmental testing of avionics hardware

Environmental Conditions and Test Procedures for Airborne Equipment
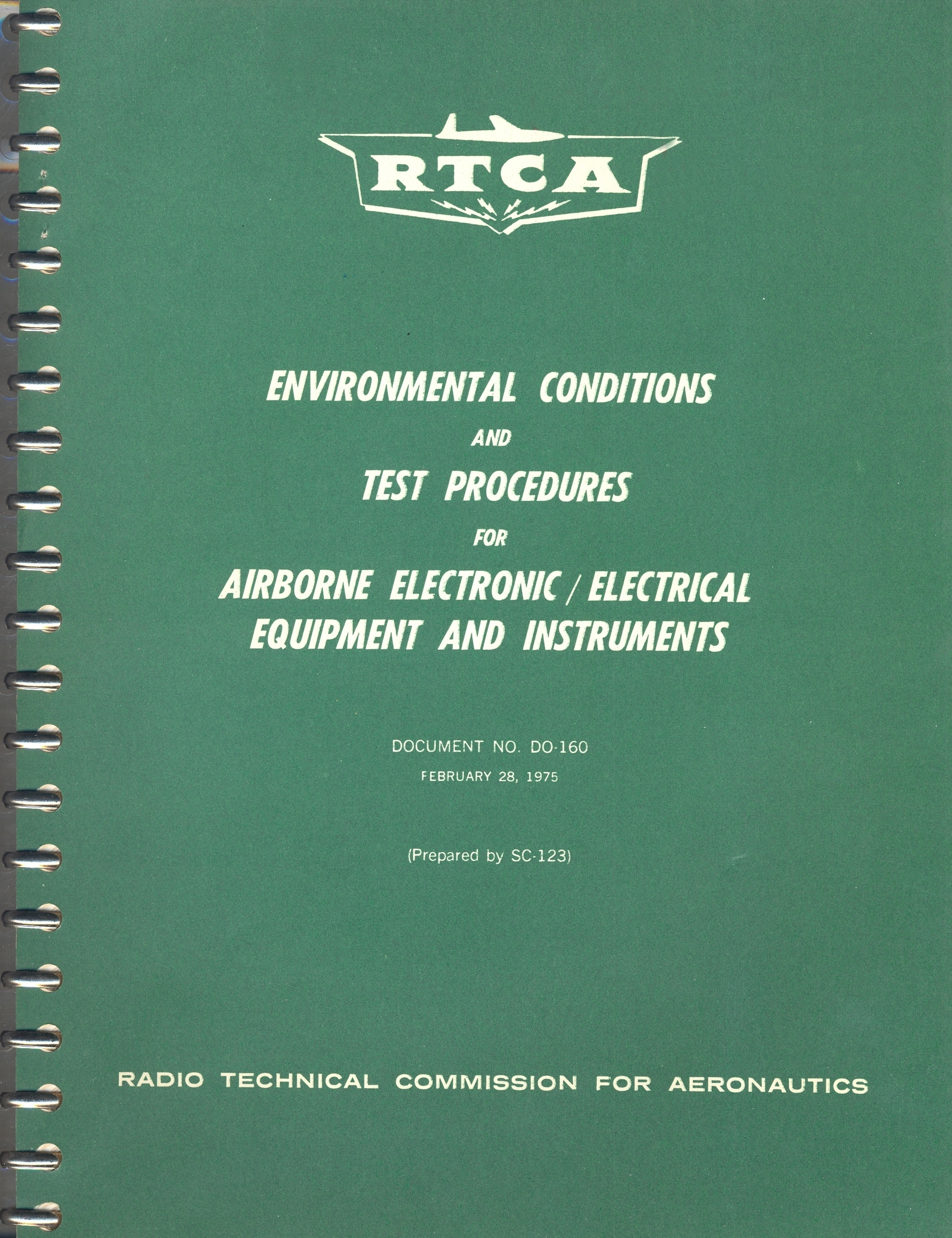
- Cover of original 1975 issue
- Abbreviation: RTCA DO-160; EUROCAE ED-14
- Status: Published
- Year started: 1975
- Latest version: G December 2010
- Organization: RTCA; EUROCAE
- Committee: RTCA SC-135; EUROCAE WG-14
- Domain: Aviation
- Website: rtca.org

DO-160, Environmental Conditions and Test Procedures for Airborne Equipment is a standard for the environmental testing of avionics hardware. It is published by the Radio Technical Commission for Aeronautics (RTCA) and supersedes DO-138.

== Outline of contents ==
=== Introduction ===
The DO-160 document was first published on February 28, 1975 to specify test conditions for the design of avionics electronic hardware in airborne systems. Since then the standard has undergone subsequent revisions up through Revision G.

=== Purpose ===
This document outlines a set of minimal standard environmental test conditions (categories) and corresponding test procedures for airborne equipment for the entire spectrum of aircraft from light general aviation aircraft and helicopters through the jumbo jets and supersonic transport categories of aircraft. The purpose of these tests is to provide a controlled (laboratory) means of assuring the performance characteristics of airborne equipment in environmental conditions similar of those which may be encountered in airborne operation of the equipment.

The standard environmental test conditions and test procedures contained within the standard, may be used in conjunction with applicable equipment performance standards, as a minimum specification under environmental conditions, which can ensure an adequate degree of confidence in performance during use aboard an air vehicle. The Standard Includes Sections on:

Section	Name	Description
	Standard conditions	
4.0	Temperature	This checks the effects of temperature on the system. Condensation also can be a factor coming from cold temperatures.
4.0	Altitude	These tests check the effects (in terms of performance) of altitude, including loss of cabin pressure on the device/system/equipment. Factors tested include dielectric strength, cooling under low pressure, and resilience to rapid change in air pressure. The norm defines the different temperature profiles under which the equipment must be tested. Due to the variety of aircraft, the equipment are classified in categories.
5.0	Temperature variation	These tests exercise the assemblies capability of surviving extreme temperature changes and the effects of differing coefficients of thermal expansion.
6.0	Humidity	These tests under humidity check the effects of high concentrations of humidity and the articles ability to withstand moisture effects such as corrosion. Typically moisture sensitive devices have issues with this test and require conformal coat or other types of protection.
7.0	Shock & crash safety	This aircraft type dependent test checks the effects of mechanical shock. Crash safety test insures the item does not become a projectile in a crash. The norm describes the test procedure for airborne equipment.
8.0	Vibration	Aircraft type dependent test checks the effects of vibration and the equipment's ability to operate during all vibration scenarios.
9.0	Explosion proofness	These tests subject the test article to an environment under vacuum, with a gaseous mixture of combustibles. The unit must operate and be subjected to any actuation including knob turns and button pushes and not ignite the environment.
10.0	Water proofness	These tests subject the test article to various scenarios of dripping water or pooled water to verify the unit will fully operate in the given condition.
11.0	Fluids susceptibility	Aviation related fluids susceptibility including a variety of fluids ranging from carbonated sugared beverage to various cleaners and solvents.
12.0	Sand & dust	This test subjects the unit to an environment of blowing sand and dust of specific particle sizes in which the unit must operate at the end of exposures.
13.0	Fungus resistance	These tests determine whether equipment material is adversely affected by fungi under conditions favorable for their development, namely, high humidity, warm atmosphere and presence of inorganic salts.
14.0	Salt & fog	This test verifies the test articles ability to survive multiple exposures of salt fog and drying and the environment's ability to cause accelerated corrosion.
15.0	Magnetic effect	This test determines the magnetic effect of the equipment and ensures it can operate properly without interference which may affect the nearby equipment, particularly the aircraft's compass.
16.0	Power input	Input power conducted emissions and susceptibility, transients, drop-outs and hold-up. The power input tests simulate conditions of aircraft power from before engine start to after landing including emergencies.
17.0	Voltage spike	This test determines whether equipment can withstand the effects of voltage spikes arriving at the equipment on its power leads, either AC or DC.
18.0	Audio frequency conducted susceptibility	This test determines whether the equipment will accept frequency components of a magnitude normally expected when the equipment is installed in the A/C. These frequency components are normally harmonically related to the power source fundamental frequency.
19.0	Induced signal susceptibility	This test determines whether the equipment interconnect circuit configuration will accept a level of induced voltages caused by the installation environment. This section relates specifically to interfering signals related to the power frequency and its harmonics, audio frequency signals, and electrical transients that are generated by other on-board equipment or systems and coupled to sensitive circuits within the EUT through its interconnecting wiring.
20.0 and 21.0	RF emission and susceptibility	Radio frequency energy: -- radiated emissions and radiated susceptibility (HIRF) via an electromagnetic reverberation chamber.
22.0 and 23.0	Lightning susceptibility	Direct and indirect effects depending on mounting location; includes induced transients into the airframe or wire bundle.
24.0	Icing	This test determine performance characteristics for equipment that must operate when exposed to icing conditions that would be encountered under conditions of rapid changes in temperature, altitude and humidity.
25.0	ESD	This checks for resilience vs ESD in handling and operation.
26.0	Flammability	This analysis and test verifies the assembly will not provide a source to fire.

The user of the standard must also decide interdependently of the standard, how much additional test margin to allow for uncertainty of test conditions and measurement in each test.

== Version history ==
- RTCA/DO-160, RTCA, INC., February 28, 1975
- RTCA/DO-160 A, RTCA, INC., January 25, 1980
- RTCA/DO-160 B, RTCA, INC., July 20, 1984
- RTCA/DO-160 C, RTCA, INC., December 4, 1989
- RTCA/DO-160 C, Change 1, RTCA, INC., September 27, 1990
- RTCA/DO-160 C, Change 2, RTCA, INC., June 19, 1992
- RTCA/DO-160 C, Change 3, RTCA, INC., May 13, 1993
- RTCA/DO-160 D, RTCA, INC., July 29, 1997
- RTCA/DO-160 D Change 1, RTCA, INC., December 14, 2000
- RTCA/DO-160 D Change 2, RTCA, INC., June 12, 2001
- RTCA/DO-160 D Change 3, RTCA, INC., December 5, 2002
- RTCA/DO-160 E, RTCA, INC., December 9, 2004
- RTCA/DO-160 F, RTCA, INC., December 6, 2007
- RTCA/DO-160 G, RTCA, INC., December 8, 2010
- RTCA/DO-160 G Change 1, RTCA, INC., December 16, 2014

== Resources ==
- FAR Part 23/25 §1301/§1309
- FAR Part 27/29
- AC 23/25.1309
- RTCA DO-160

== Bibliography ==
- Aircraft Systems: Mechanical, Electrical and Avionics Subsystems Integration (Aerospace Series (PEP)) (Jun 3, 2008) by Ian Moir and Allan Seabridge
- RTCA List of Available Documents, RTCA Inc., https://web.archive.org/web/20130512172348/http://www.rtca.org/Files/ListofAvailableDocsMarch2013.pdf (March 2013)
- Avionics: Development and Implementation (Electrical Engineering Handbook) by Cary R. Spitzer (Hardcover - Dec 15, 2006)
- Avionics Navigation Systems (April 1997) by Myron Kayton and Walter R. Fried
- http://www.rvs.uni-bielefeld.de/publications/Incidents/DOCS/Research/Rvs/Article/EMI.html
- The European Organization for Civil Aviation Equipment EUROCAE ED-14

== Certification in Europe ==
- Replace FAA with EASA, JAA or CAA
- Replace FAR with JAR
- Replace AC with AMJ

== See also ==
- Hazard analysis
- Reliability (semiconductor)
- MIL-STD-810
- ARP4754
- ARP4761
- RTCA/DO-254
- RTCA/DO-178C
