= Quality audit =

Examination of quality systems by auditors

Quality audit is the process of systematic examination of a quality system carried out by an internal or external quality auditor or an audit team. It is an important part of an organization's quality management system and is a key element in the ISO quality system standard, ISO 9001.

== Purpose ==
Quality audits are typically performed at predefined time intervals and ensure that the institution has clearly defined internal system monitoring procedures linked to effective action. This can help determine if the organization complies with the defined quality system processes and can involve procedural or results-based assessment criteria.

With the upgrade of the ISO9000 series of standards from the 1994 to 2008 series, the focus of the audits has shifted from purely procedural adherence towards measurement of the actual effectiveness of the Quality Management System (QMS) and the results that have been achieved through the implementation of a QMS.

Audits can also be used for safety purposes. Evans & Parker (2008) describe auditing as one of the most powerful safety monitoring techniques and 'an effective way to avoid complacency and highlight slowly deteriorating conditions', especially when the auditing focuses not just on compliance but effectiveness.

Audits are an essential management tool to be used for verifying objective evidence of processes, to assess how successfully processes have been implemented, for judging the effectiveness of achieving any defined target levels, to provide evidence concerning reduction and elimination of problem areas. For the benefit of the organization, quality auditing should not only report non-conformances and corrective actions, but also highlight areas of good practice. In this way other departments may share information and amend their working practices as a result, also contributing to continual improvement.

Quality audits can be an integral part of compliance or regulatory requirements. One example is the US Food and Drug Administration, which requires quality auditing to be performed as part of its Quality System Regulation (QSR) for medical devices (Title 21 of the US Code of Federal Regulations part 820).

Several countries have adopted quality audits in their higher education system (New Zealand, Australia, Sweden, Finland, Norway and USA) Initiated in the UK, the process of quality audit in the education system focused primarily on procedural issues rather than on the results or the efficiency of a quality system implementation.

== Format ==
The processes and tasks that a quality audit involves can be managed using a wide variety of software and self-assessment tools. Some of these relate specifically to quality in terms of fitness for purpose and conformance to standards, while others relate to Quality costs or, more accurately, to the Cost of poor quality. In analyzing quality costs, a cost of quality audit can be applied across any organization rather than just to conventional production or assembly processes

== See also ==
- DQS-UL
- Final quality audit
- Quality management
- SGS S.A.
- TÜV Rheinland
