= Diagnostic design specification =

Diagnostic design specification is a document indicating how the diagnostics will be implemented on upcoming/new products that will be developed by the company. It describes the behavior of the diagnostics like how the test will execute, how the output messages are formatted, and how the final result is displayed (among others). This document is usually defined by the manufacturing team (more specifically, the manufacturing test engineers) and will be submitted to the software-diagnostic group for approvals.

In reality, not all the specifications can be delivered on time for the build-up of the first prototype boards so all the tests defined in the document usually are given in phases. Once both teams agree on the delivery timeline, the document is signed by both teams and put into some kind of document control. It is possible that the document may be changed from time to time like when other teams introduce new components or remove them.

== See also ==
- Functional specification
- Specification (technical standard)
