= High-intensity radiated field =

A high-intensity radiated field (HIRF) is radio-frequency energy of a strength sufficient to adversely affect either a living organism or the performance of a device subjected to it. A microwave oven is an example of this principle put to controlled, safe use. Radio-frequency (RF) energy is non-ionizing electromagnetic radiation – its effects on tissue are through heating. Electronic components are affected via rectification of the RF and a corresponding shift in the bias points of the components in the field.

The U.S. Food and Drug Administration (FDA), and U.S. Federal Communications Commission (FCC) set limits for the amounts of RF energy exposure permitted in a standard work-day.

== History ==
The U.S. Federal Aviation Administration (FAA) and industry EMC leaders have periodically met to define the adequacy of protection requirements for civil avionics from outside interference since 1980. In 1986 The FAA Technical Center contracted for a definition of the electromagnetic environment for civil aviation. This study was performed by the Electromagnetic Compatibility Analysis Center (ECAC). The study has shown levels of exposure to this threat as high as four orders of magnitude (10000 times) higher than the then current civil aircraft EMC susceptibility test certification standards of 1 volt/meter (DO-160). This environment was also two orders of magnitude higher (100 times) than the then prevailing military avionics systems test standards (MIL-STD 461/462).

== Units of measurement ==
An RF electromagnetic wave has both an electric and a magnetic component (electric field and magnetic field), and it is often convenient to express the intensity of the RF environment at a given location in terms of units specific to each component. For example, the unit "volts per meter" (V/m) is used to express the strength of the electric field (electric "field strength"), and the unit "amperes per meter" (A/m) is used to express the strength of the magnetic field (magnetic "field strength"). Another commonly used unit for characterizing the total electromagnetic field is "power density." Power density is most appropriately used when the point of measurement is far enough away from an antenna to be located in the "far-field" zone of the antenna.

== See also ==
- Radiation
- Radio frequency

== Bibliography ==
- Vander Vorst, Andre; Arye Rosen; Youji Kotsuka (2005). RF/microwave interaction with biological tissues. Hoboken, NJ: Wiley-Interscience. ISBN 978-0-471-73277-8.
- Kitchen, Ronald (2001). RF and microwave radiation safety handbook. Oxford: Newnes. ISBN 978-0-7506-4355-9.
