= Direct-field acoustic testing =

Testing method

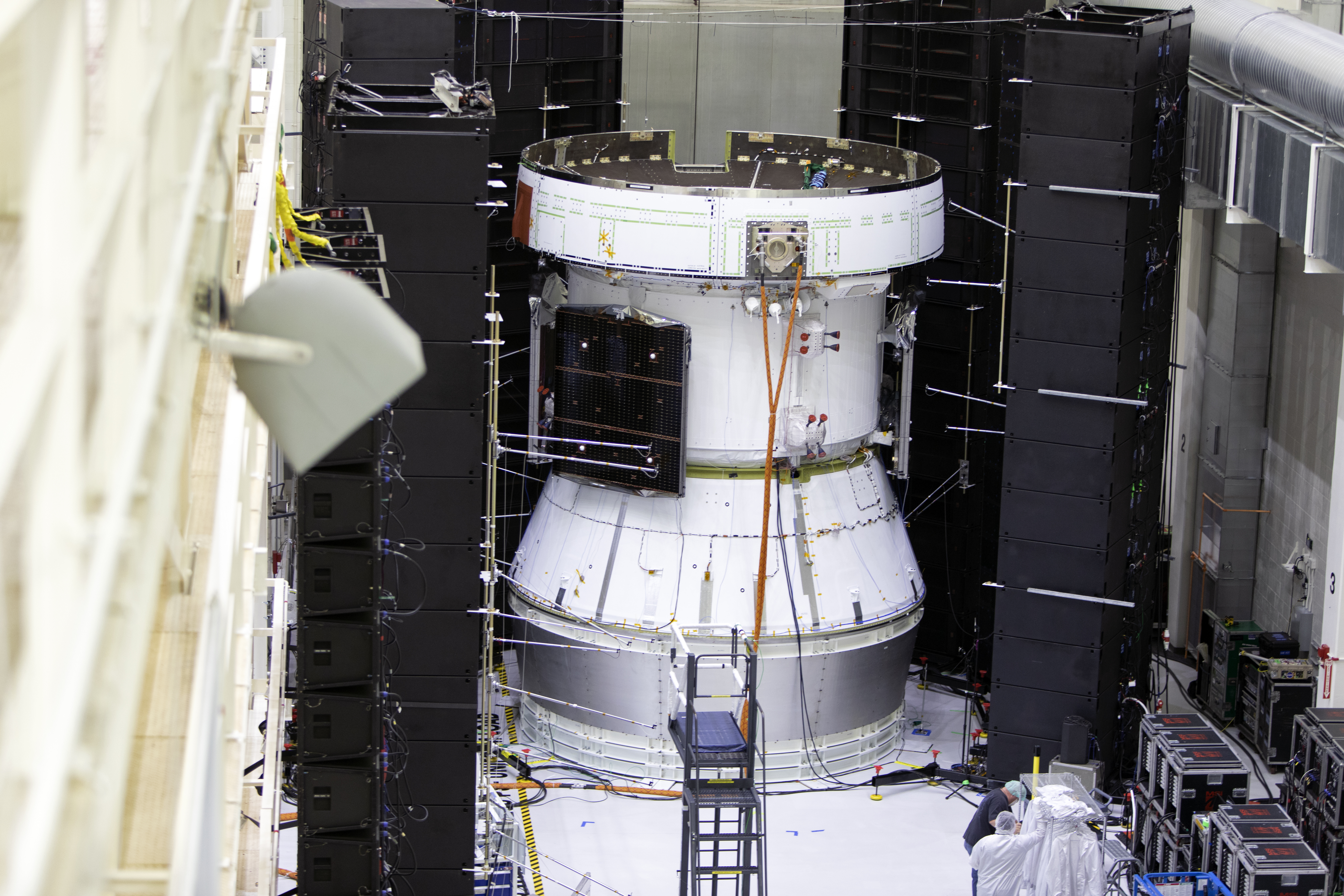
MSI DFAT test setup

Direct-field acoustic testing, (DFAT), is a technique used for acoustic testing of aerospace structures by subjecting them to sound waves created by an array of acoustic drivers. The method uses electro-dynamic acoustic loudspeakers, arranged around the test article to provide a uniform, well-controlled, direct sound field at the surface of the unit under test. The system employs high capability acoustic drivers, powerful audio amplifiers, a narrow-band multiple-input-multiple-output (MIMO) controller and precision laboratory microphones to produce an acoustic environment that can simulate a helicopter, aircraft, jet engine or launch vehicle sound pressure field. A high level system is capable of overall sound pressure levels in the 125–154 dB for more than one minute over a frequency range from 15 Hz to 31 kHz.

== Overview ==
A direct field is generated by audio drivers arranged to encircle the test article. Two different control schemes can be used to perform a direct field test. One method, known as single-input-single-output or SISO, uses a single drive signal to all acoustic drivers with multiple control microphones averaged to produce the control measurement. This method will produce a set of correlated plane waves that may combine to produce large magnitude variations creating local fluctuations on the test article surface. Magnitude variations as much as +/−12dB can be experienced. The second method, known as MIMO, uses multiple independent drive signals to control multiple independent microphone locations. This method produces a more uncorrelated field that is much more uniform than the SISO field. Magnitude variations in the range of +/-3dB are typical when using MIMO control.

The technique uses normal incident plane waves in a shaped spectrum of acoustic noise to impact directly on all exposed test article surfaces without external boundary reflections. Depending on the geometry of the test article this could produce magnitude variations on surfaces due to phasing differences between the plane waves. In the case of large surface area, low mass density test articles the phasing difference may excite primary structure modes in a different way than more conventional reverberant-field testing. This fundamental difference and its impact on the structure must be weighed against the advantages of the DFAT method.

An advantage of DFAT over reverberant testing is the portability of the DFAT system. This allows the test equipment to be transported to any location, setup, calibrated, used to perform an acoustic test and then removed from the test site. The entire process from load-in to load-out can be accomplished in no more than 4 days for a large satellite or similar aerospace structure. The test system uses a “building block” approach to form combinations of equipment to satisfy the environmental requirements. Systems typically include many loudspeakers, 2 million plus watts of amplification, at least 8 to 16 control microphones, and a closed-loop MIMO acoustic control and data acquisition system. The mobility and “building block” approach allows this method to be tailored for each application and to provide a more timely and cost effective test solution. This method can also be useful for testing articles that are too large to fit inside a traditional acoustic reverberant chamber.

== Process ==
The process requires the transport to and assembly of a loudspeaker circle around the test article. The size of the circle is dependent on the size of the test article. Generally, a circle 12 feet (3.7 m) in diameter larger and 4 feet (1.2 m) taller than the test article is required. The arrangement should avoid symmetry to reduce the potential for adverse coupling of plane waves. The test article can be mounted on a platform or suspended. Multiple microphones, eight to sixteen, should be used for control with either the SISO or MIMO methods. The microphones should be placed randomly around the test article. The distance from the surface of the drivers to the surface of the control microphones should be 1.0–1.5 meters (3.3–4.9 feet). The distance from the control microphones to the surface of the test article should be 0.5–0.75 meters (1.6–2.5 feet). The height of the control microphones should be centered at mid-height of the test item and randomly varied up and down by about one-eighth of the test item height. The orientation of the free-field microphones in a DFAN arrangement is not critical. However, reflections from the test article can be minimized with the microphone oriented toward the sound source with a 0 degree incidence. Most modern day, quality measurement, free-field microphones are factory adjusted to compensate for incident angle. This phenomenon is most pronounced at high frequencies, above 10 kHz for a 1/4" microphone, and is inversely proportional to microphone diaphragm diameter.

The loudspeakers are driven by a series of audio amplifiers that are usually powered by a portable diesel generator. The system is safely and accurately controlled by a closed-loop feedback control system that can be used to limit and/or abort if an over-test condition is detected.

A pretest is usually performed using a simulator to confirm the specified overall sound pressure level and spectrum can be achieved. The pre-test is also used to verify any special control features such as; abort tolerances, response limits, field shaping and emergency shut-down procedures. The microphone responses should then be examined to evaluate the resulting field for uniformity, coherence and if available, structural response. Then the simulator is replaced with the actual test item in the loudspeaker circle and the test process is repeated.

The entire operation is usually completed in four days, and only requires the test article for one of those days. All equipment is brought to the test article, assembled, pretested and performance-checked before testing the flight article. The flight article is generally required for only one day of testing depending on the complexity of the test plan. On completion of the flight test, the article is removed and all equipment is disassembled and transported from the site.

Features

- Portability: can be set up almost anywhere
- Modularity: adapts to multiple configurations
- Controllability: safe, repeatable, real-time control
- Narrow-band control: can provide control to a spec defined at constant, narrow-band (~3 Hz) increments from 25 to 10 kHz
- Response limiting: limit on SPL, acceleration, force or stress response values
- Over-test protection: abort on peak or rms input values

== Capabilities ==
The convenience, low cost, and mobility of this method distinguish it from conventional testing and are the primary reasons for its growing popularity. The method is convenient because all required sound system, power generation and distribution and data acquisition and control equipment is brought to the test site. Equipment is usually leased for each test event. There is no large investment in a facility, equipment or personnel required on the part of the customer. A diesel generator is the preferred power source, therefore providing clean on-site electrical power in a consistent configuration for connection to the power distribution equipment. This removes the demand for large quantities of power from the test facility. In addition, testing can be performed at a much lower cost per test compared to the installation, operation and maintenance of a more standard high intensity reverberant acoustic chamber system. Finally, mobility allows this test method to be performed at almost any time and place in the normal test article integration and test flow. The test equipment is completely portable and no special facility or infrastructure is required.

== Resource chronology ==
1. Measurement of Correlation Coefficients in Reverberant Sound Fields, Cook, Waterhouse, Berendt, Edelman, Thompson, J-ASA, Vol.27, No.6, 11/11/1955
2. The Development of Sonic Environmental Testing, John Van Houten, IEST, 1966
3. Combined Loads, Vibration and Modal Testing of the QuickScat Spacecraft, Scharton(JPL), Vujcich(Ball), 18th ATS, 3/16-18/1999
4. Combining Spacecraft Vibration & Acoustic Tests, Terry Scharton, S/C & L/V Dynamic Environments Workshop, June 1999
5. Direct, Near-Field Acoustic Tests, Larkin & Tsoi, S/C & L/V Dynamic Environments Workshop, June 1999
6. The Coherence of Reverberant Sound Fields, Jacobson & Rosin, J-ASA, Vol.108, No.1, 03/21/2000
7. Direct, Near-Field Acoustic Testing at Orbital Sciences Corporation, Paul Larkin, IEST/ESTECH 2000, May 2000
8. Direct Near-Field Acoustic Testing – Update, Larkin, S/C & L/V Dynamic Environments Workshop, June 2000
9. Direct Acoustic Test of the QuickSCAT Spacecraft, D. Anthony, T. Scharton, A. Leccese, SAE/AIAA World Aviation Congress, 10/19-21/00
10. Direct, Near Field Acoustic Testing, Larkin & Whalen, SAE/AIAA World Aviation Congress, 10/19-21/00
11. An Innovative Acoustic Test Method for the Faster, Better, Cheaper Environment, Paul Larkin,19th Aerospace Testing Seminar, October 2000
12. Direct Near-Field Acoustic Testing – Work-in-Progress, Paul Larkin, S/C & L/V Dynamic Environments Workshop, June 2001
13. High-Intensity Acoustics Testing, IEST-RP-DTE040.1, Institute of Environmental Sciences and Technology, January, 2003.
14. Control of an Acoustical Speaker System in a Reverberant Chamber, Paul Larkin & Dave Smallwood, 21st Aerospace Testing Seminar, October 2003
15. Rectangular Control of Muli-Shaker Systems: Theory and Some Practical Results, Underwood and Keller, Spectral Dynamics, Inc., San Jose, CA, 2003
16. JAGUAR Random Acoustic Control and Analysis Operating Note, 2560-0122/A, Spectral Dynamics, Inc., San Jose, CA, 2003
17. Direct Field Acoustic Test and Simulation Analysis, Fred Hausle, Steve Johnston, John Stadille, S/C & L/V Dynamic Environments Workshop, June 2004
18. Control of an Acoustical Speaker System in a Reverberant Chamber, Paul Larkin & Dave Smallwood, 21st Aerospace Testing Seminar, 10/21/2004
19. Direct Acoustic Verses Reverberant Testing of the Cloud Profiling Radar Instrument, Michael O’Connell & Fred Hausle, S/C & L/V Dynamic Environments Workshop, June 2005
20. Direct Field and Reverberant Chamber Acoustic Test Comparisons, Michael O’Connell, S/C & L/V Dynamic Environments Workshop, June 2007
21. Investigations Toward Development of Standard Practices for Direct Field Acoustic Testing, Michael B. Van Dyke, 24th Aerospace Testing Seminar, April 2008
22. Toward Development of Standard Practices in Direct Field Acoustic Testing, Michael B. Van Dyke, S/C & L/V Dynamic Environments Workshop, June 2008.
23. Direct Field Acoustic Testing, Paul Larkin and Bob Goldstein, 25th AIAA/Space Simulation Conference, October 2008.
24. Direct Field vs Reverberant Field Acoustic Testing, Gordon Maahs, Spacecraft & Launch Vehicle Dynamic Environments Workshop, June 2009.
25. Direct Field Acoustic Test (DFAT) - Recommended Practice, Paul Larkin, Spacecraft & Launch Vehicle Dynamic Environments Workshop, June 2009.
26. Acoustically Induced Vibration of Structures, Reverberant vs. Direct Acoustic Testing, Koliani, O’Connell, Tsoi, 25th Aerospace Testing Seminar, October 2009.
27. Direct Field Acoustic Test – Recommended Practice, Larkin and Goldstein, 25th Aerospace Testing Seminar, October 2009.
28. Direct Field Acoustic Test (DFAT), Paul Larkin, AIAA/Working Group on Dynamic Space Simulation, May 2010.
29. Direct Field vs. Reverberant Field DFAT, Larkin and Maahs, SC & LV Dynamic Environments Workshop, June 2010.
30. Recent Developments in Direct Field Acoustic Testing, Larkin and Goldstein, 26th Space Simulation Conference. October 2010.
31. Direct Field Acoustic Testing of a Flight System: Logistics, Challenges and Results, Babuska, Gurule, Skousen, Stasiunas, 81st Shock & Vibration Symposium, October 2010.
32. Analytical Modeling of the Acoustic Field During a Direct Field Acoustic Test, Mesh, Rouse, Stasiunas, 26th Aerospace Testing Seminar, March 2011.
33. Small Direct Field Acoustic Noise Facility, Saggini, Tiani, Ribour, Poulain, Herzog, 26th Aerospace Testing Seminar, March 2011.
34. Acoustic Testing of Flight Hardware Using Loudspeakers: How Much Do We Know About This Method, Kolaini and Kern, 26th Aerospace Testing Seminar, March 2011.
35. Issues Related to Large Flight Hardware Acoustic Qualification Testing, Kolaini, Kern and Perry, 26th Aerospace Testing Seminar, March 2011.
36. Spatial Variability Caused by Acoustic Wave Interference in Single-Drive Direct Field Acoustic Testing, VanDyke and Peters, 26th Aerospace Testing Seminar, March 2011.
37. Small Direct Field Acoustic Noise Test Facility, Saggini, Tiani, Ribour, Poulain and Herzog, 26th Aerospace Testing Seminar, March 2011.
38. Direct Field Acoustic Testing (DFAT) Recommended Practice (RP) Development, Foss and Larkin, IEST/ESTECH 2011, May 2011.
39. Vibro-acoustic Predictions: Direct Acoustic vs. Reverberant Acoustic Fields, Ali Kolaini, SC & LV Dynamic Environments Workshop, June 2011.
40. MIMO Acoustic Control for DFAT, Larkin and Spicer, SC & LV Dynamic Environments Workshop, June 2011.
41. Temporal Evaluation of DFAT Data Quality, Levi Smith, IEST/ESTECH 2012, May 2012.
42. Using Narrow-band Difference as a Comparative Metric for Acoustic Fields, Clinton Maldoon, IEST/ESTECH 2012, May 2012.
43. Direct Field Acoustic Test of the RBSP Spacecraft, Gordon Maahs, 27th Aerospace Testing Seminar, October 2012.
44. Status of Direct Field Acoustic Testing, Hayes and Larkin, 27th Aerospace Testing Seminar, October 2012.
45. Some Questions Regarding Aspects of Acoustic Testing and Test Facilities, Arloe Wesley Mayne III, 27th Aerospace Testing Seminar, October 2012.
46. Experiences in Performing a High-Intensity, Direct Field Acoustic Test on a Contamination-Sensitive System, Stasiunas, Babuska, and Skousen, 27th Aerospace Testing Seminar, October 2012.
47. Impact of Acoustic Standing Waves on Structural Responses: Reverberant Acoustic Testing (RAT) vs. Direct Field Acoustic Testing (DFAT), Kolaini, Doty, and Chang, 27th Aerospace Testing Seminar, October 2012.
48. Further Developments Using MIMO Acoustic Control for DFAT, Paul Larkin, 27th Space Simulation Conference, November 2012.
