= Physical test =

Type of product test in quality assurance

A physical test is a qualitative or quantitative procedure that consists of determination of one or more characteristics of a given product, process or service according to a specified procedure. Often this is part of an experiment.

Physical testing is common in physics, engineering, and quality assurance.

== Purposes ==
Physical testing might have a variety of purposes, such as:

- if, or verify that, the requirements of a specification, regulation, or contract are met
- Decide if a new product development program is on track: Demonstrate proof of concept
- Demonstrate the utility of a proposed patent
- Provide standard data for other scientific, engineering, and quality assurance functions
- Validate suitability for end-use
- Provide a basis for Technical communication
- Provide a technical means of comparison of several options
- Provide evidence in legal proceedings

== Performance testing ==
Some physical testing is performance testing which covers a wide range of engineering or functional evaluations where a material, product, or system is not specified by detailed material or component specifications. Rather, emphasis is on the final measurable performance characteristics. Testing can be a qualitative or quantitative procedure. Many acceptance testing protocols employ performance testing e.g. In the stress testing of a new design of chair.

=== Examples of performance testing ===
- Structural testing: building and Construction Performance Testing
- Fire protection (ASTM D176)
- Packaging Performance (hazardous materials, dangerous goods, ASTM D4169)
- Performance Index for Tires (ASTM F538)
- Performance Test Code on Compressors and Exhausters (ASME PTC 10 - 1997)
- Personal protective equipment performance
- Several Defense Standards
- Wear of Textiles (ASTM D123)

== Gallery ==
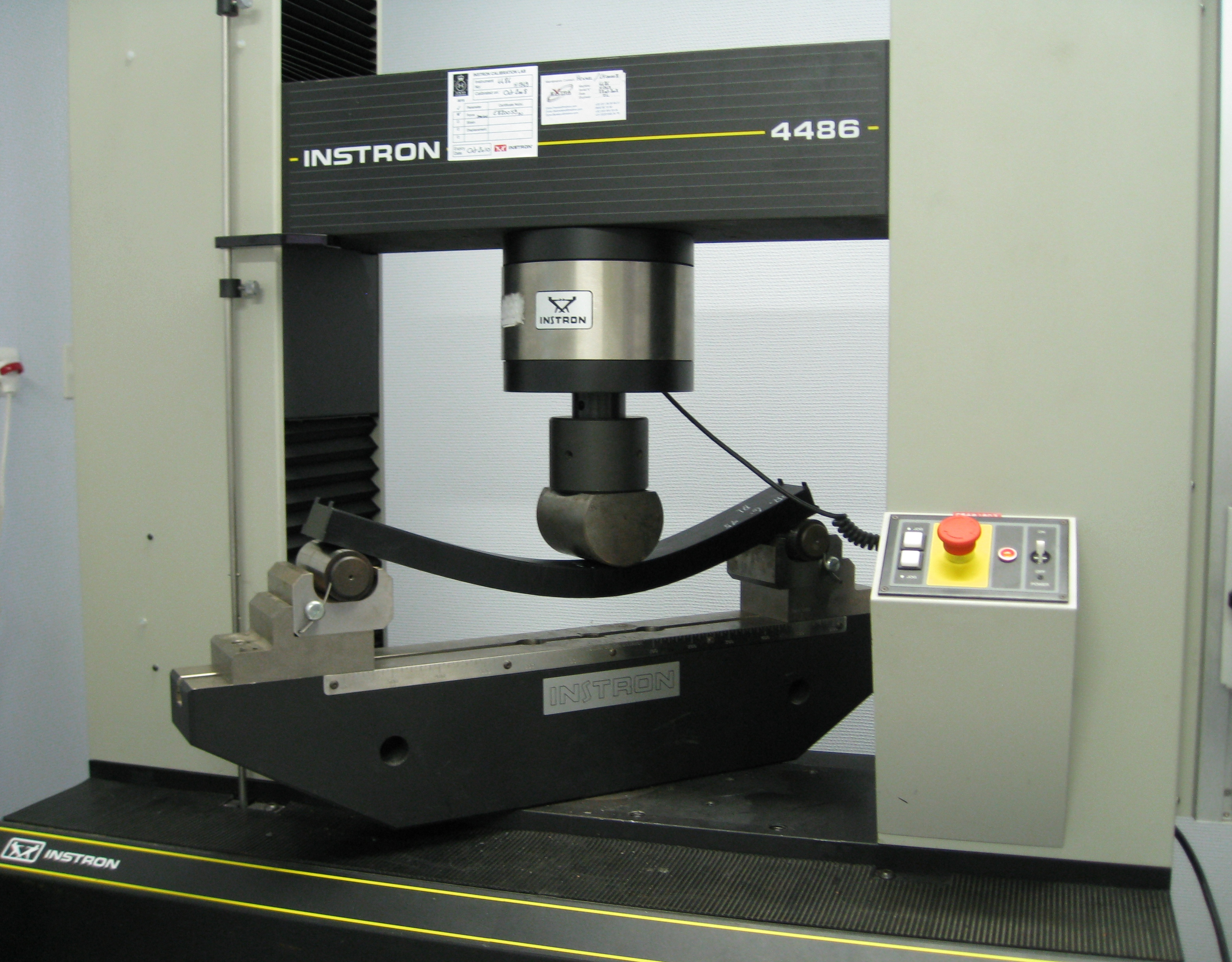
Test fixture on universal testing machine

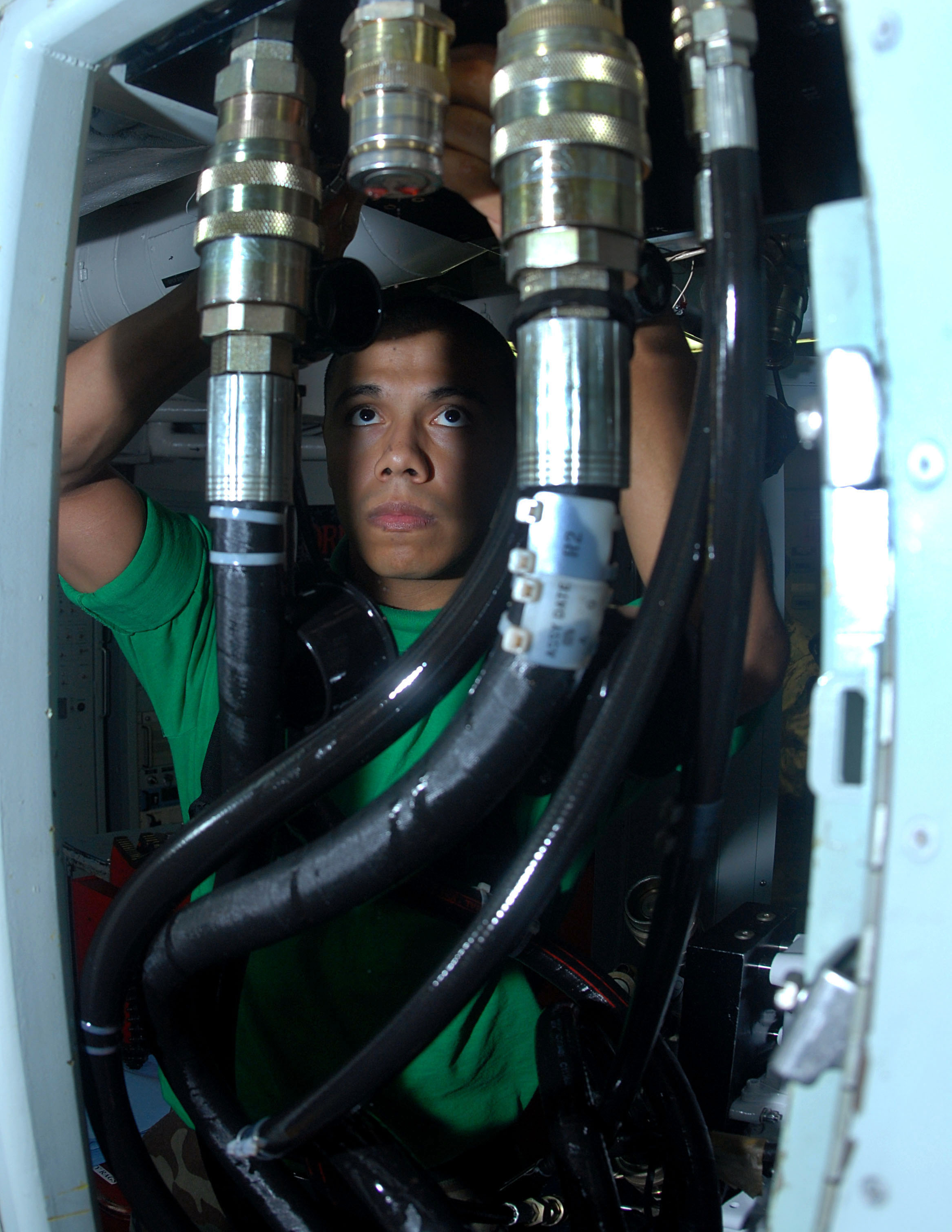
Hydraulic system testing

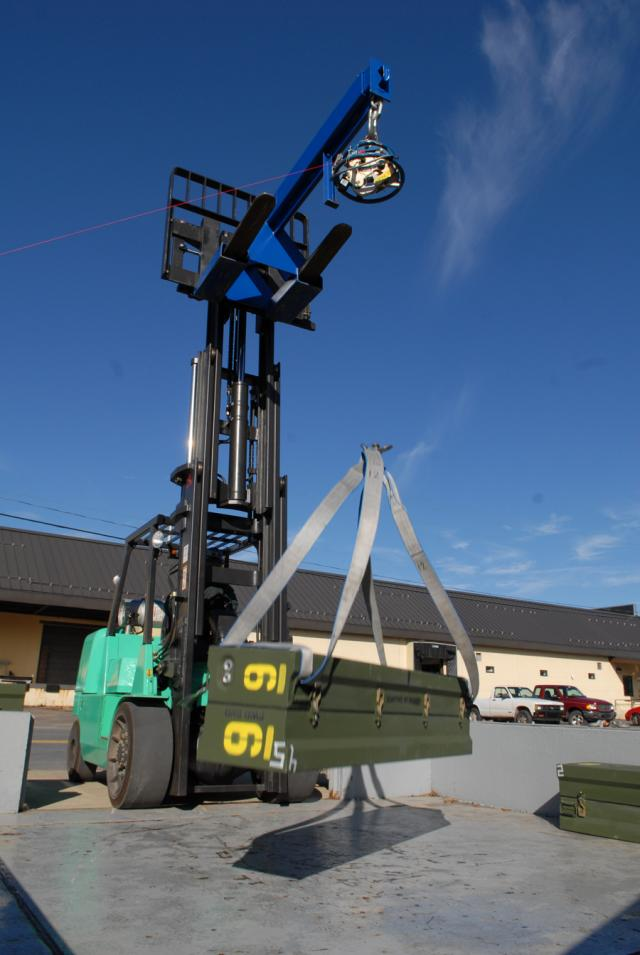
Drop test of shipping container for missile

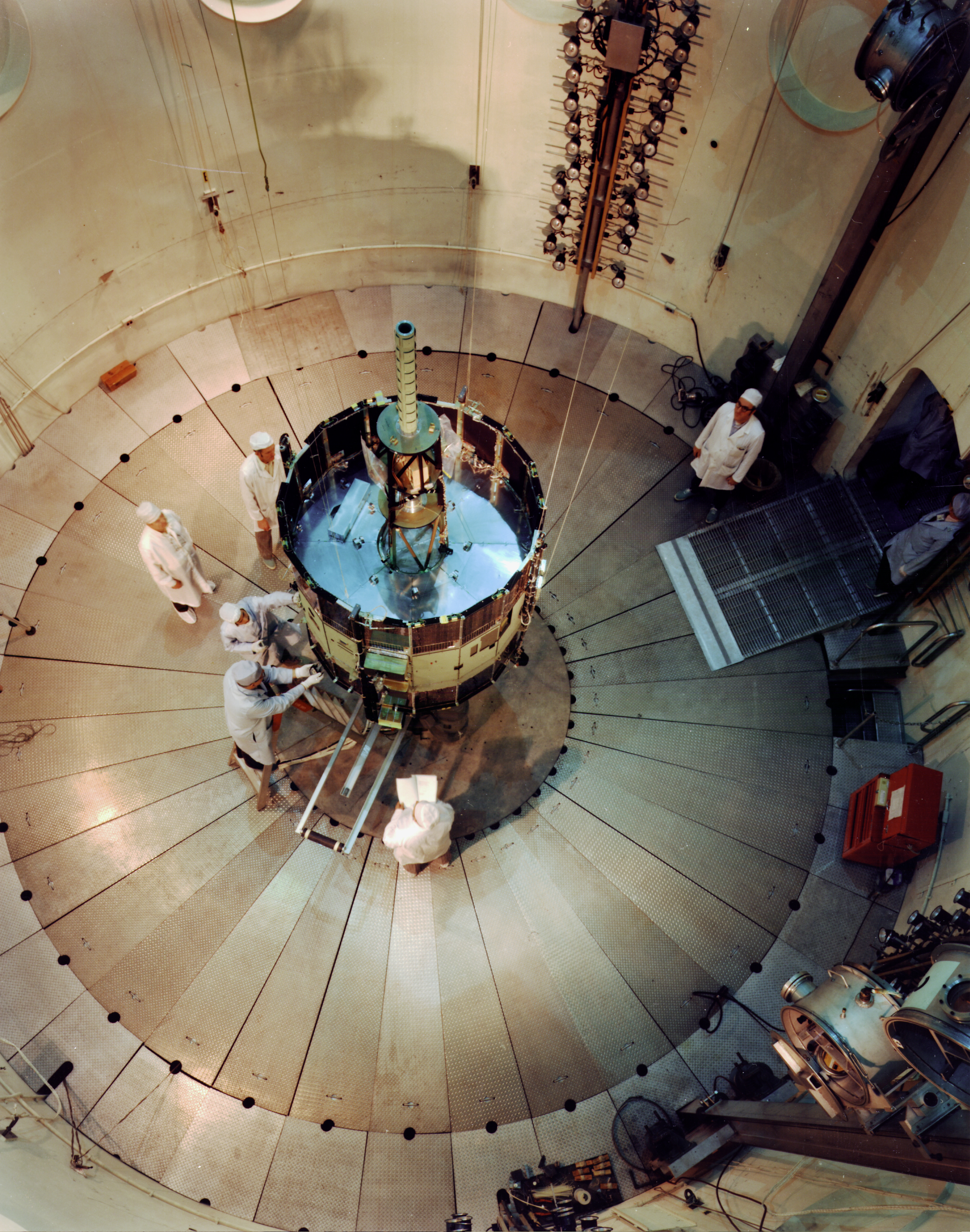
Engineers in NASA dynamic test chamber

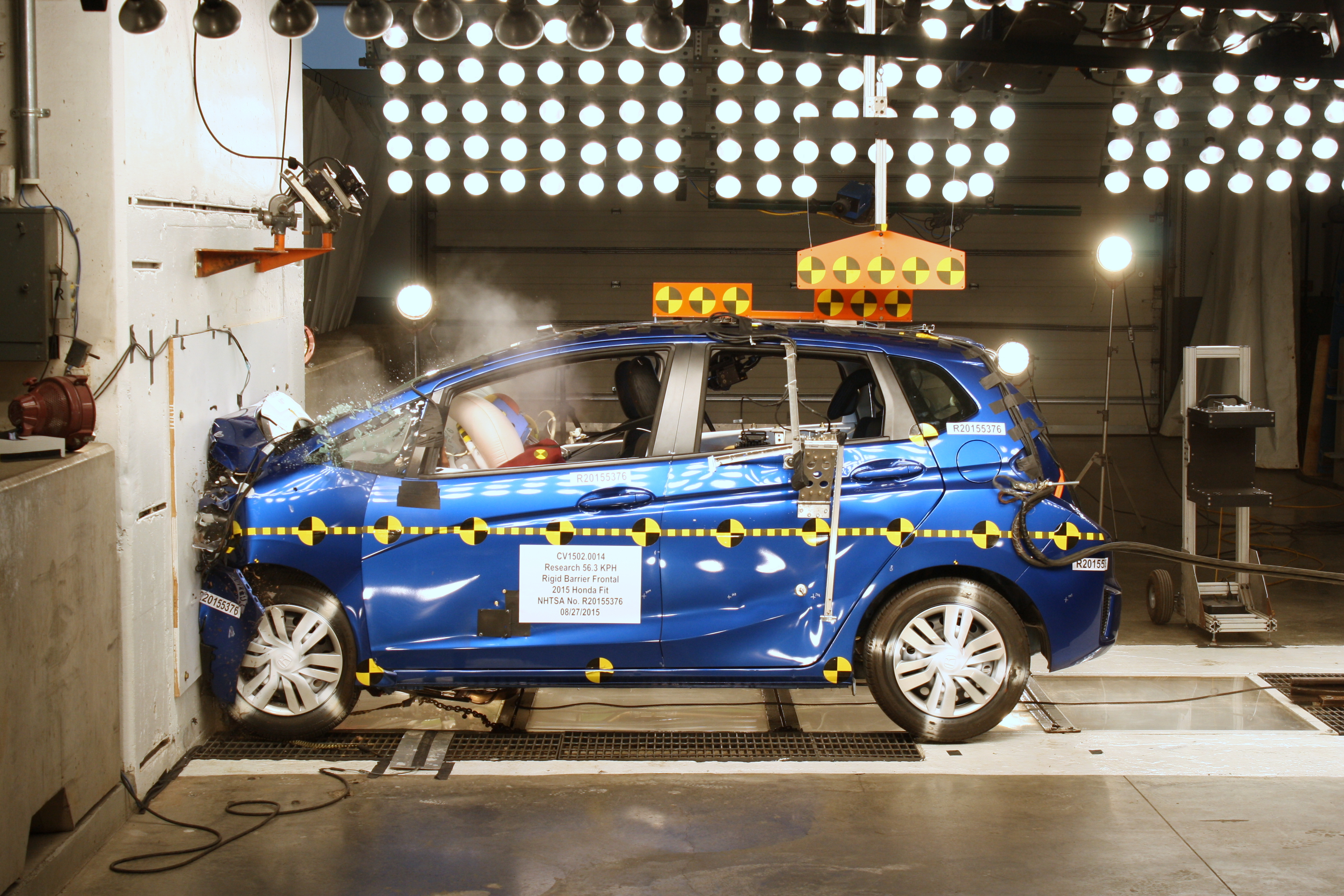
Crash test of car striking a wall

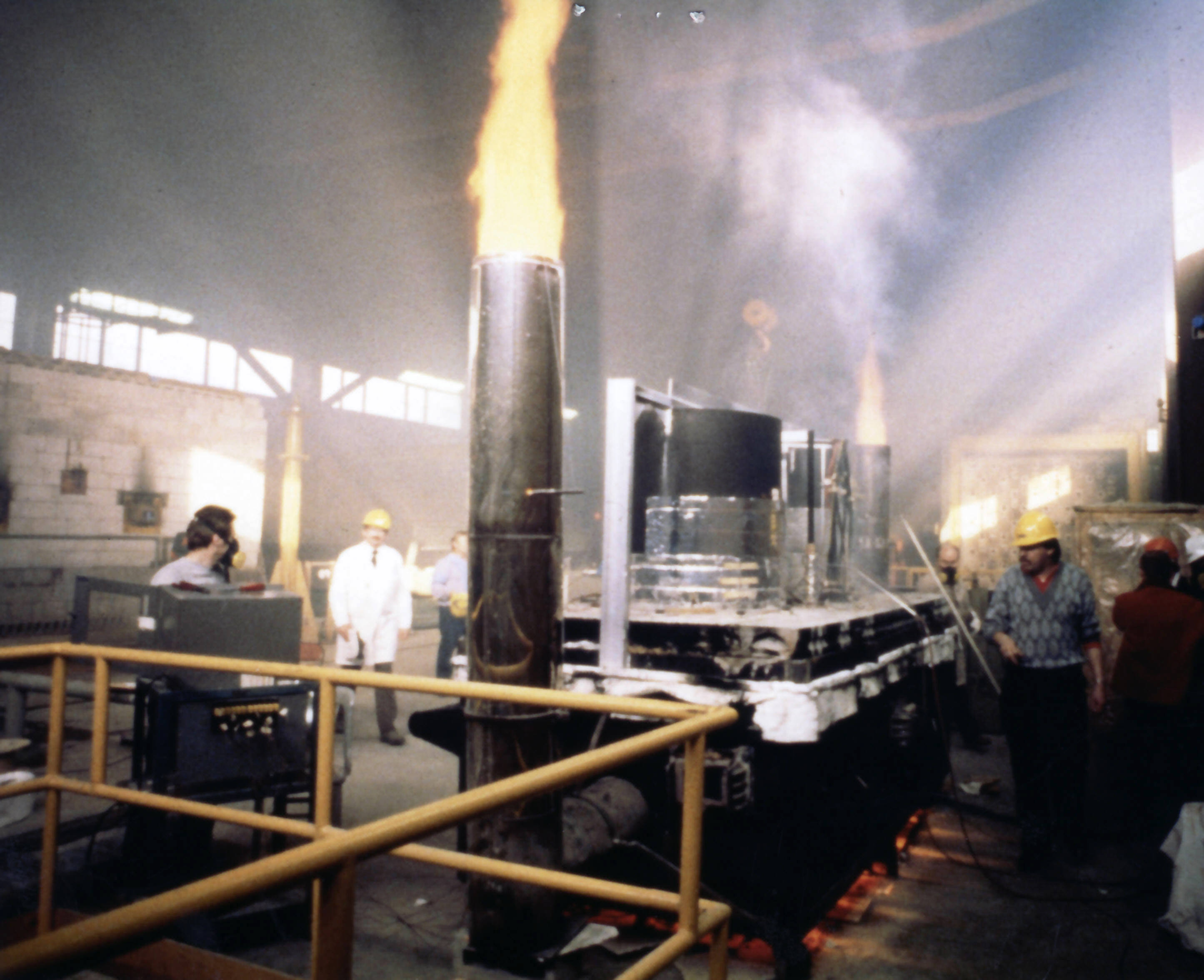
Fire testing materials and structures

== See also ==
- Environmental chamber
- Test method
- Independent test organization
- Measurement uncertainty
