= Environmental chamber =

Enclosure for testing materials under controlled conditions

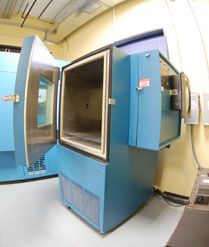
Example of a temperature/humidity chamber

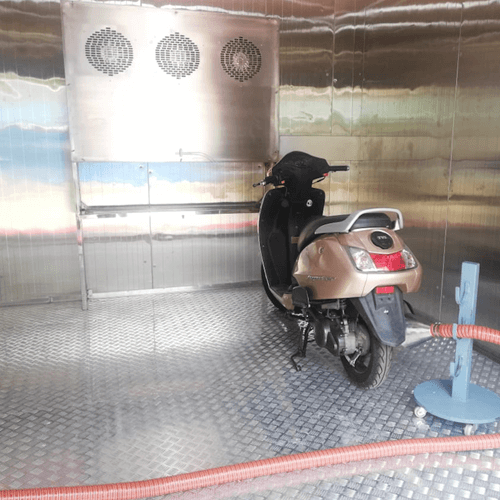
Example of a Walk-In Environmental Chamber used for automobile reliability testing in various simulated environment

An environmental chamber, also called a climatic chamber or climate chamber, is an enclosure used to test the effects of specified environmental conditions on biological items, industrial products, materials, and electronic devices and components.

Such a chamber can be used:

1. as a stand-alone test for environmental effects on test specimens
2. as preparation of test specimens for further physical tests or chemical tests
3. as environmental conditions for conducting testing of specimens

== Overview ==
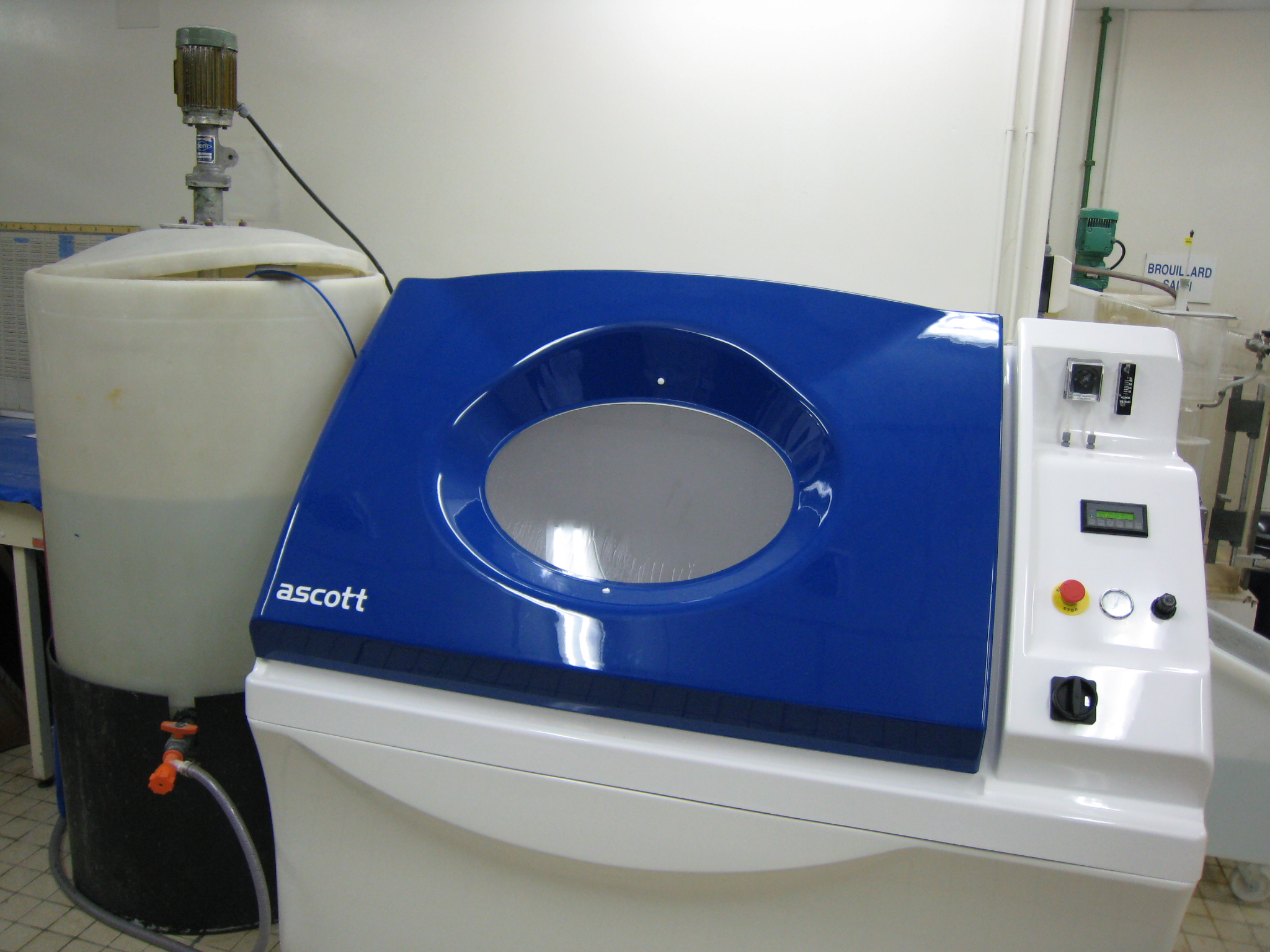
Chamber for salt spray

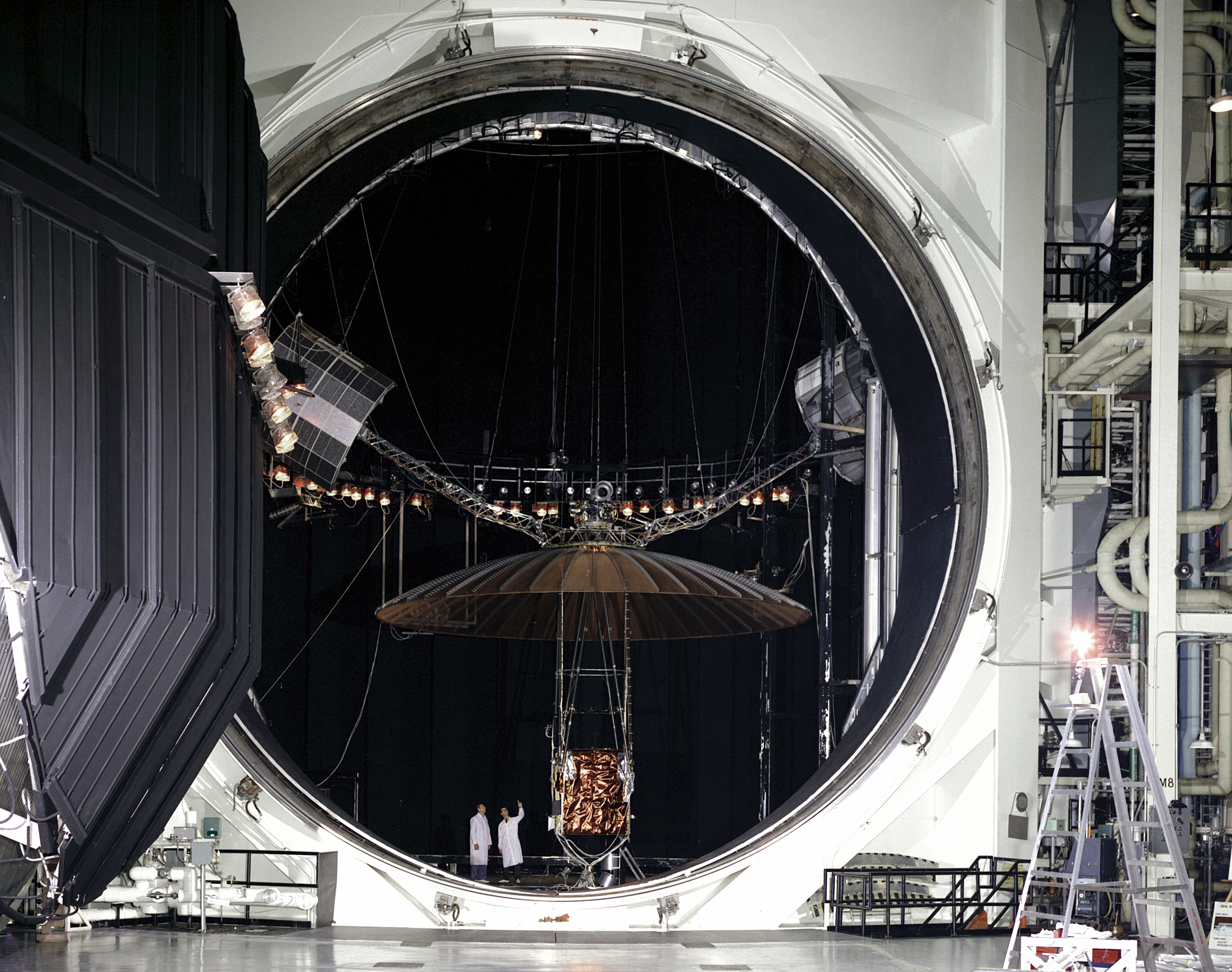
Large NASA vacuum chamber

An environmental test chamber artificially replicates conditions which machinery, materials, devices or components might be exposed to. It is also used to accelerate the effects of exposure to the environment, sometimes at conditions not actually expected.

Chamber testing involves testing and exposing products to various environmental conditions in a controlled setting. Climatic Chamber testing and Thermal Shock testing are part of chamber testing. Climatic Chamber testing is a broad category of ways to simulate climate or excessive ambient conditions exposure for a product or a material under laboratory-controlled yet accelerated conditions. On the other hand, Thermal Shock testing is used to simulate how materials will react when exposed to changes in extreme climatic conditions, such as going from extremely cold to extremely hot conditions in a very short period of time (usually only few seconds).

These conditions may include:

- extreme temperatures
- sudden and extreme temperature variations - thermal shock
- altitude
- moisture or relative humidity
- electrodynamic vibrations
- electromagnetic radiation
- Cyclic corrosion testing
- salt spray
- rain
- weathering
- exposure to sun, causing UV degradation
- vacuum

Manufactured samples, specimens, or components are placed inside the chamber and subjected to one or more of these environmental parameters to determine reliability or measure after-effects such as corrosion. In the case of machinery such as internal combustion engines, byproducts such as emissions are monitored.

An environmental chamber can be a small room used both to condition test specimens and to conduct the test. It can be a smaller unit that's used for conditioning test items. Also, some chambers are small enough to be placed onto a universal testing machine or other test apparatus.

Many chambers are set at a certain set of conditions. Others can be programmed to cycle through specified sequences of conditions.

== Design ==
As test requirements may be relatively simple or complex, environmental test chambers vary widely in size, ranging from small units designed for placement on bench tops to large walk-in chambers. Test chambers generally have viewports or video feeds to allow for visual inspection of the sample during the test. Reach-in chambers provide an opening that technicians may use to handle test samples. Chambers providing interior visual lighting must take into account the heat generated and compensate accordingly.

As with the wide variance in size, a number of user control options are available, ranging from simple analog indicators up to more modern digital readouts with LCD displays. Chambers may be computer programmable, and networked or Web-enabled test chambers with built in web servers are also available.

== Types of test chambers ==
- Mechanically cooled test chambers
- Liquid nitrogen cooled test chambers
- Modular Walk-in Chambers

== Test chamber standards ==
Several standards organizations provide standards and guidance on environmental test chamber construction, temperature control standards, and engineering tolerances.

- Institute of Environmental Sciences and Technology
- Air Conditioning, Heating and Refrigeration Institute (formerly the American Refrigerant Institute)
- American Society of Heating, Refrigerating, and Air-Conditioning Engineers Air conditioning#Heating
- ASTM International
- Underwriters Laboratories
- NSF International
- FM Global
- Canadian Standards Association
- International Organization for Standardization
- MIL-STD-810, "Test Method Standard for Environmental Engineering Considerations and Laboratory Tests", presently (2010) version G, issued in 2009
- IEC 60068, "Environmental Testing", with many parts.

== See also ==
- Cyclic corrosion testing
- Salt spray test
- Environmental stress cracking
- Doriot Climatic Chambers
- Accelerated aging
- Environmental stress screening
- Environmental stress fracture
- MIL-STD-810, DoD Standard for Environmental Engineering Considerations and Laboratory Tests
- Shelf life
- Standard conditions for temperature and pressure
- Thermo-mechanical fatigue test
- Universal testing machine
- Weather testing of polymers
- Stabilizers for polymers
