= Final quality audit =

The final quality audit (FQA) process, in the electronic hardware manufacturing world, is the last process flow before shipping a product. This process is established to ensure the unit has gone through and passed all the manufacturing or test process and is in good quality.

This process not only includes visual checking of the unit (i.e. labels has been placed properly, no scratches, no dents, all LED/lights are functional) but also checks that the correct firmware and version plus configuration has been loaded properly. It must power up according to specs as well.

There are cases where a separate out-of-the-box audit (OBA) process is defined, but most of the time this can be combined as well. OBA is just a visual check making sure that the unit has, again, the correct labels plus all the manuals or other parts that needs to ship with it is also inside the box. Labels from the unit should also match the ones outside the box.

Besides checking good quality of the unit, this process also must ensure that none of the configuration will be touched. There are cases where a firmware tracks down the last power ON it had and thus leave some new information to the unit. Although these changes are sometimes acceptable, a good test engineer should always plan a strategy along with the firmware developers to put a feature in place to reset this information.

== See also ==
- Quality audit
