= Ongoing reliability test =

Hardware test process

The ongoing reliability test (ORT) is a hardware test process usually used in manufacturing to ensure that quality of the products is still of the same specifications as the day it first went to production or general availability.

The products currently in the manufacturing line are randomly picked every day with a predefined percentage or numbers and then put in a control drop tower or an environmental chamber. Control drop simulates physical interactions on the product, while environmental chamber simulates the stress profile of thermal cycling, elevated temperature, or combined environmental stresses to induce fatigue damage. The profile should stimulate the precipitation of latent defects that may be introduced from the manufacturing process but not remove significant life from the product or introduce flaws to risk failure during its intended mission. highly accelerated stress test is an ongoing reliability test that uses the empirical operational limits as the reference for the combined vibration, thermal cycling, and other stress applied to find latent defects.

Quality of the products is then measured with the results of this test. If a unit fails, it goes under investigation to see what caused the failure and then remove the cause whether it came from an assembly process or from a component being incorrectly manufactured, or any other cause. If it is proven that a real failure occurs, the batch of units that were produced along with the failed unit, is then tagged for re-test or repair to either verify or fix the problem.
