= MIL-STD-461 =

US Standard (test)

MIL-STD-461 is a United States Military Standard that describes how to test equipment for electromagnetic compatibility.

The United States Department of Defense issued MIL-STD-461 in 1967 to integrate electromagnetic compatibility into the research and development stage for defense communications technology. Various revisions of MIL-STD-461 have been released.

Many military contracts require compliance to MIL-STD-461E. The latest revision (as of 2026) is known as "MIL-STD-461H". While MIL-STD-461 compliance is technically not required outside the US military, many civilian organizations also use this document. In 1999, MIL-STD-462 was combined with MIL-STD-461D into MIL-STD-461E.
