= Qazwini =

Qazwini with two possible derivations:

- Qazwini (Persian: قزويني qazwīni), the name derived from "Qazvin" (versions of the topographical surname: Qazvini, Qazwini, Qazvini, al-Quazvini), formerly the Safavid dynastic capital (1555-1598), which is Iran's calligraphy capital today. Also, the name refers to a dialect of Persian language, Qazvini.
- Qazwini (ِArabic: قزويني qazwīni), the old Arabicized name of the Caspian Sea, also called "Bahr Qazwin (بحر قزوين baḥr qazwīn)".

It may refer to the following persons:

- Abu Abdallah Muh. b. Yazid b. Maja al-Rab`i al-Qazwini (fl. 9th century), hadith scholar
- Abu Yahya Zakariya' ibn Muhammad al-Qazwini (1203–1283), Persian physician geographer
- Ahmad Ghaffari Qazvini (d. 1568), Persian scribe and historian
- Najm al-Dīn al-Qazwīnī al-Kātibī (d. 1277), Persian philosopher astronomer
- Ḥamdallāh Mustawfī Qazvīnī (1281–1349), Persian historian geographer
- Shah-Mohammad Qazvini (died 1557), palace physician and belle-lettrist
- Aref Qazvini (1882), Iranian poet
- Mullá Hádí-i-Qazvini of the Bábís
- Mir Emad Hassani Qazvini, (1554-1615), master of calligraphy
- Hassan Al-Qazwini, (1964- ) Islamic Center Imam
- Budaq Monshi Qazvini (1510-1577), Persian composer
- Mohammad Taher Vahid Qazvini (d. 1699 CE), Iranian nobleman
- Goharshad Ghazvini (d. 1628), Persian calligrapher
- Mohammad Qazvini (1876-1949), Iranian literary critic
- Murtadha al-Qazwini Twelver Shia Marja'
