= Shahrak-e Danesh =

Shahrak-e Danesh (Persian: شهرك دانش) may refer to:

- Shahrak-e Danesh, Qazvin
- Shahrak-e Danesh, Tehran
