= Qazvin =

City in Qazvin province, Iran

Qazvin قزوین Minoodar, Razhia, Arsas
- City
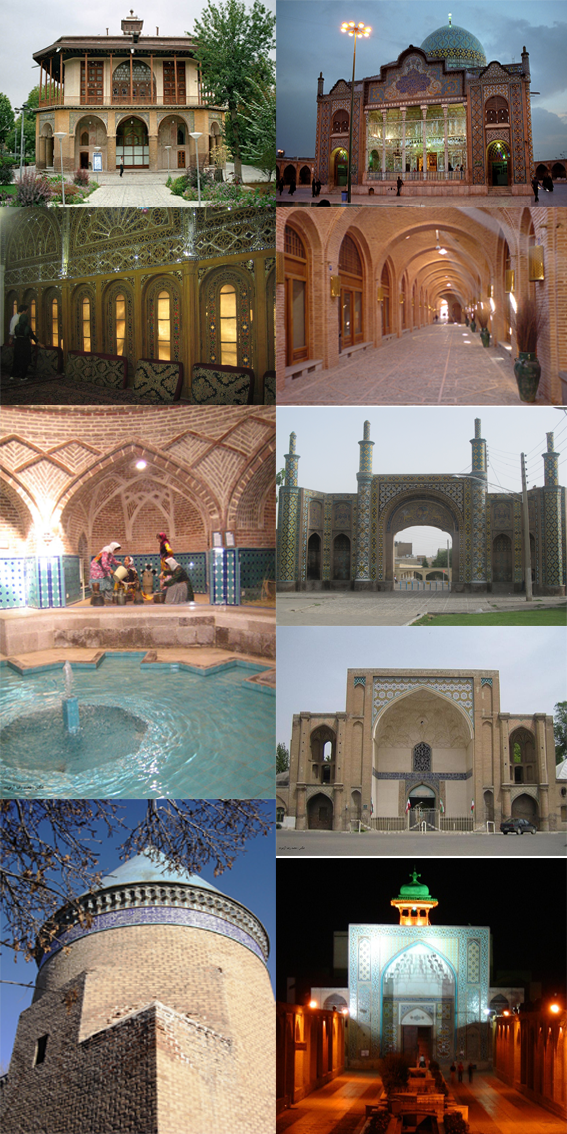
- Left: Chahel Stoun Palace, Aminiha Hosseiniyeh, Anthropology Qajar Bath Musume, Tomb of Hamdollah Mostofi, Right: Shazdeh Hosein Shrine, Caravanserai of Sa'd al-Saltaneh, Qazvin Ghadim Gate, Qazvin Jameh Mosque, Al-Nabi Mosque of Qazvin (all items are from above to bottom)

- Seal
- Motto(s): Mirror of History & Natural of Iran
- Location within Iran
- Coordinates: 36°17′19″N 50°00′25″E
- Country: Iran
- Province: Qazvin
- County: Qazvin
- District: Central

Government
  - Type: City Council
  - Mayor: Mehdi Sabbaghi

Area
  - Total: 64.132 km^{2} (24.762 sq mi)
- Elevation: 1,278 m (4,193 ft)

Population (2016)
  - Total: 402,748
  - Density: 9,030/km^{2} (23,400/sq mi)
- Time zone: UTC+3:30 (IRST)
- Area code: 028
- Climate: BSk
- Website: www.qazvin.ir

Qazvin (Persian: قزوین; /kæzˈviːn/; IPA: [ɢæzˈviːn]) (Note: Also romanized as Qazvīn and Qazwin; also known as Casbeen, Casbin, Caspin, Ghazvin, Kasvin, and Kazvin) is a city in the Central District of Qazvin County, Qazvin province, Iran, serving as capital of the province, the county, and the district. It is the largest city in the province.

Qazvin was a capital of the Safavid Empire for over forty years (1555–1598) and nowadays is known as the calligraphy capital of Iran. It is famous for its traditional confectioneries (like Baghlava), carpet patterns, poets, political newspaper and Pahlavi influence on its accent.

Located in 150 km (93 mi) northwest of Tehran, in the Qazvin Province, it is at an altitude of about 1,800 m (5,900 ft) above sea level. Due to its position at the south of the rugged Alborz range called KTS Atabakiyam, its climate is cold but dry.

== History ==
Qazvin has sometimes been of central importance at major moments of Iranian history. It was captured by invading Arabs (644 AD) and destroyed by Hulagu Khan (13th century). In 1555, after the Ottoman capture of Tabriz, Shah Tahmasp (1524–1576) made Qazvin the capital of the Safavid Empire, a status that Qazvin retained for half a century until Abbas the Great moved the capital to Isfahan in 1598. It is a provincial capital today that has been an important cultural center throughout its history.

Qazvin is located at a crossroad connecting Tehran, Tabriz, and the Caspian Sea region, which has historically been a major factor in its commercial importance. However, it never rivalled other major Iranian cities like Ray, Nishapur, or Isfahan during the Middle Ages. One reason is that its growth is constrained by a lack of water. Until fairly recently, the entire Qazvin plain was irrigated by just a single qanat and four small streams.

=== Prehistory ===
The earliest remains of prehistoric humans have been discovered in a cave called Qaleh Kurd where archaeologists discovered a Neanderthal tooth. Archaeological findings in the Qazvin plain reveal urban agricultural settlements for at least nine millennia.

=== Sasanian era ===
Qazvin was founded by Shapur I (r. 240–270), the second ruler of the Sasanian Empire. It was refounded by Shapur II (r. 309–379), who established a coin mint there. Under the Sasanians, Qazvin functioned as a frontier town against the neighbouring Daylamites, who made incursions into the place.

=== Early Islamic dynasties ===
Qazvin came under the expanding Rashidun Caliphate in 644, during the reign of Umar. It was taken by Al-Bara' ibn 'Azib, who besieged the city and received a request for a sulh (agreement) from its inhabitants. They were offered the same terms as Abhar had earlier, but the people of Qazvin did not want to pay jizya and supposedly accepted Islam instead. Al-Bara' then used Qazvin as a base for further campaigns into Daylam and Gilan. Later, when Sa'id ibn al-'As was appointed governor of Persia under the Umayyads, he built a new town called Hājjāj at Qazvin.

Two more new cities were founded at Qazvin during the late 8th century. The Abbasid caliph Musa al-Hadi founded a new city called Mādina Mūsā next to Hājjāj. He bought nearby Rustamābād and designated it as a waqf for the benefit of the new town. His freedman Mubarak, a Turk, also founded a new town at Qazvin in 792/3 (176 AH), called Mubarakābād after himself.

Harun al-Rashid visited Qazvin while on his way to Khorasan and saw firsthand the locals' struggles as a result of the Daylamite raids. At the same time, he was impressed by their efforts to fend off the Daylamites. Harun suspended Qazvin from having to pay the kharaj tax and instead ordered an annual payment of 10,000 silver dirhams. He had a wall constructed around the new cities of Mādina Mūsā and Mubarakābād and also built a congregational mosque in the city, and he endowed several buildings as a waqf to support the mosque. The mosque no longer exists today.

Harun's wall was not completed until 868, over half a century after his death. (Note: It was completed by Musa ibn Bugha al-Kabir.) It had 206 towers and 12 gates and was built out of mud brick except for the battlements and gates. When it was finished, more people began to settle in Qazvin. Its population was heavily Arab during this time.

Qazvin remained an important frontier town during the wars between the Abbasid caliphate and the Alid rulers of the Caspian. The caliph al-Mu'tasim appointed Fakhr al-Dawla Abu Mansur Kufi as governor of Qazvin around 838; he remained governor for the next 40 years. For a couple of years around 865/6, the Alids under Hasan ibn al-Bakir took control of Qazvin, and Fakhr al-Dawla continued to serve as governor under them.

Qazvin briefly came under Samanid rule in 905/6 (293 AH) when Ilyas ibn Ahmad became governor. The next year, though, the governorship passed to Fakhr al-Dawla Abu Ali, an ancestor of Hamdallah Mustawfi, and he served as governor for the next 27 years. In 913/4 (301 AH) Qazvin was put under Ali ibn al-Muqtadir along with Ray, Dinavar, Zanjan, Abhar, and Tarom.

In 916/7 (304 AH), Yusuf ibn Abi'l-Saj unsuccessfully attempted to seize control of Qazvin. He was defeated by Asfar ibn Shiruya, who made himself ruler of the whole region between Tabaristan and Gorgan and Qom and Hamadan. In 927/8 (315 AH) Qazvin was the site of a battle between Asfar and an army sent by the Abbasid caliph al-Muqtadir against him. The people of Qazvin assisted the Abbasid army, but Asfar won the battle. As punishment for siding against him, Asfar destroyed parts of the city, killed many of its inhabitants, and imposed monetary demands on the city.

After Asfar's death, the Buyid ruler Rukn al-Dawla took control of Qazvin, and it remained part of Buyid territory for over a hundred years. There was rioting in the city in 968/9 (358 AH) and the Buyid vizier Abu'-Fath Ali ibn Muhammad was sent to restore order. When that was done, he imposed a fine of 1,200,000 dirhams on the city.

=== Ghaznavids, Seljuks, and Khwarazmshahs ===
Qazvin came under Ghaznavid control in 1030 (421 AH). Around 1033/4 (424 AH), Abu Ali Muhammad Ja'fari became governor of Qazvin. He and his sons continued to hold power in Qazvin for almost 60 years. The last of these sons, Fakhr ul-Ma'ali Sharafshah, died in 1091 or 1092 (484 AH) and was survived by one daughter. He was extremely wealthy and he and his followers owned most of the land in the area. The annual income from his landed estates was said to be 366,000 gold dinars.

In 1038/9 (430 AH), along with an alliance of the Ghuzz, the Daylamite ruler Fanna Khusraw came to Qazvin after already sacking Ray the year before. The locals bought them off for a sum of 7,000 dinars. Later in 1042/3 (434 AH), the Seljuk sultan Tughril besieged Qazvin. In 1046 Qazvin was visited by Nasir-i Khusraw, who left the following account:

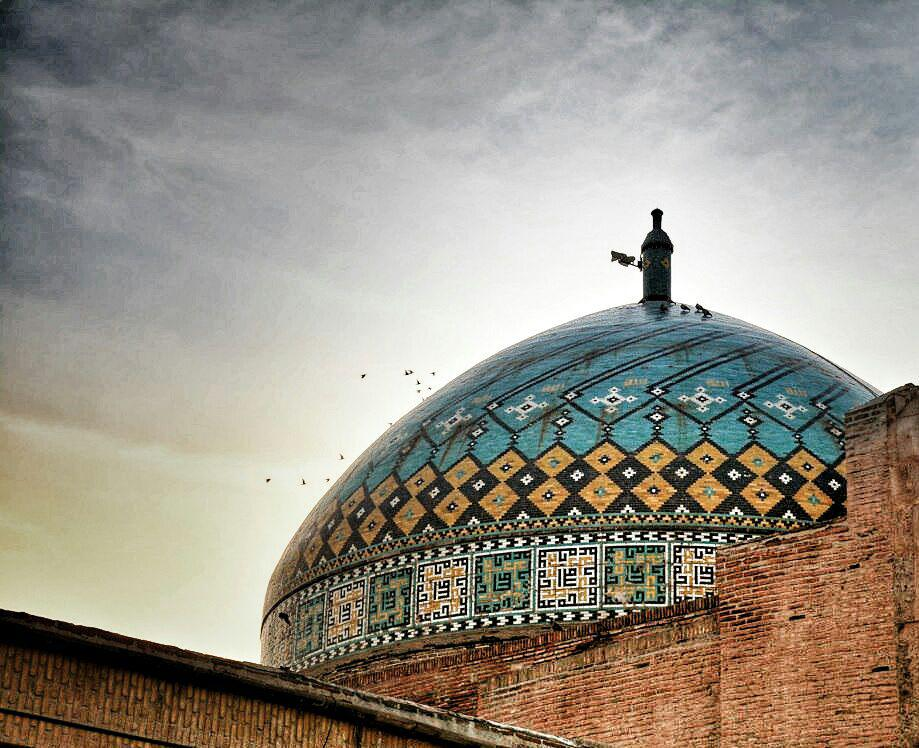
The dome chamber of the Jameh mosque is the oldest structure in Qazvin, dating from the early 1100s.

It had many gardens, without walls or thorn-hedges or any obstacle to prevent entry into them. I saw it to be a good city. It had a strong wall and embattlements. It had good bazaars, except that it only had a little water from one kariz... The ra'is of the town was an 'Alid. Of all the crafts in the town, the shoe-makers (kafshgar) were the most numerous.

— Nasir-i Khusraw, Safarnama, translation by C. Schefer

Under the Seljuks, Qazvin appears to have formed part of the central territory around the capital in Isfahan that was more or less directly ruled by the sultans, who were able to levy taxes and appoint governors here. However, despite Qazvin's position close to the Isma'ili strongholds like Alamut, the Seljuks do not seem to have considered it an important governorship to be given to an important amir. After the death of the last Ja'fari ruler of Qazvin, Malikshah appointed Imad ud-Dawla Turan ibn Alfaqash as governor of Qazvin and instructed him to transfer his household and possessions there so that he would be more invested in its governance. Later, in 1118/9 (512 AH), Sanjar assigned Qazvin to the future Tughril II along with other territories. In terms of religion, Seljuk-era Qazvin was mostly Sunni, although it did have a Shi'i quarter.

The oldest known structure in Qazvin that still exists is the dome chamber of the city's Jameh mosque, which according to its inscription was built from 1106 to 1114 (500-508 AH). Its patron was the amir Abu Mansur Khumartash ibn Abd Allah al-'Imadi. It was built adjoining an earlier madrasa that was itself built in the 10th century by the sahib Isma'il ibn Abbad. The 13th-century writer Zakariya Qazvini wrote that the dome was "unparalleled anywhere" in size; he wrote that "the masons despaired of vaulting such a huge space until a passing boy suggested that they fill the interior with straw". According to Hamdallah Mustawfi, two iwans were added to the mosque in 1153 (548 AH); the present-day north iwan is Seljuk in style and may be one of them. The present-day mosque mostly dates from the Safavid and Qajar periods; it is one of the largest mosques in Iran.

Another early monument is the Heydariyeh Mosque, which was probably built a few years after the Jameh mosque. Its original function is unclear; it could have been either a mosque or a madrasa. It features a very early use of glazed ornamentation. A unique architectural style emerged in Seljuk-era Qazvin that influenced architecture in surrounding regions, such as the mosques at Sojas and Ghorveh.

Not long after the Isma'ilis established themselves at Alamut, Abu'l-Mahasin Ruyani persuaded the Qazvinis to have anyone coming from the direction of Alamut to be out to death, to prevent people from developing sympathies for the enemy after spending time with them. In 1129 (423 AH) the Isma'ilis killed about 400 people in Qazvin in retaliation for their envoy being killed in Isfahan. Under the grandmaster Muhammad ibn Buzurg-Ummid (1138–62) the Isma'ilis conducted raids against Qazvin. In 1165 (560 AH) the Isma'ilis of Rudbar built a fortress very close to Qazvin, which threatened the city. In 1176 (572 AH), the city's walls were rebuilt by the Seljuk vizier Sadr al-Din al-Maraghi.

Qazvin later came under the Khwarazmshahs. Isma'ili raids continued during this period. When Jalal al-Din Hasan III succeeded as Isma'ili imam in 1210 (607 AH) he claimed to have converted to Sunni Islam and took the name "Naw-Musalmān" meaning "New Muslim". The people of Qazvin were skeptical and demanded proof, and he obliged by inviting some of Qazvin's leading men to Alamut Castle where he publicly burned Isma'ili texts for them to see. Also in 1210, the city was damaged by the forces of Kingdom of Georgia sent by Tamar the Great, as per the retribution for destroying Georgian-controlled Ani by the Muslim forces that left 12,000 Christians dead.

=== The Mongols ===
Meanwhile, a new threat was looming – the Mongols. Qazvin changed hands several times during their wars with the Khwarazmshahs, and in 1220 (617 AH) the Mongols massacred the city's inhabitants.

It was under the Mongols that there was large-scale Turkic migration into the Qazvin area. Although at least some must have settled there during Seljuk times, it was during the Mongols that they started coming in larger numbers. Several prominent Turkic families established themselves in Qazvin. One of them was the Būlātmūriyān, who first came during the rule of Ögedei when their member Amir Takash was appointed shihna or military governor of Qazvin. Another was the Qarāvulān, who acquired large landed estates but had already lost their prominence by the time of Hamdallah Mustawfi. However, most of the main families at his time still traced their roots back to an Arab founder. The religion was mostly Sunni of the Shafi'i madhhab, although there were Shi'i and Hanafi Sunni minorities.

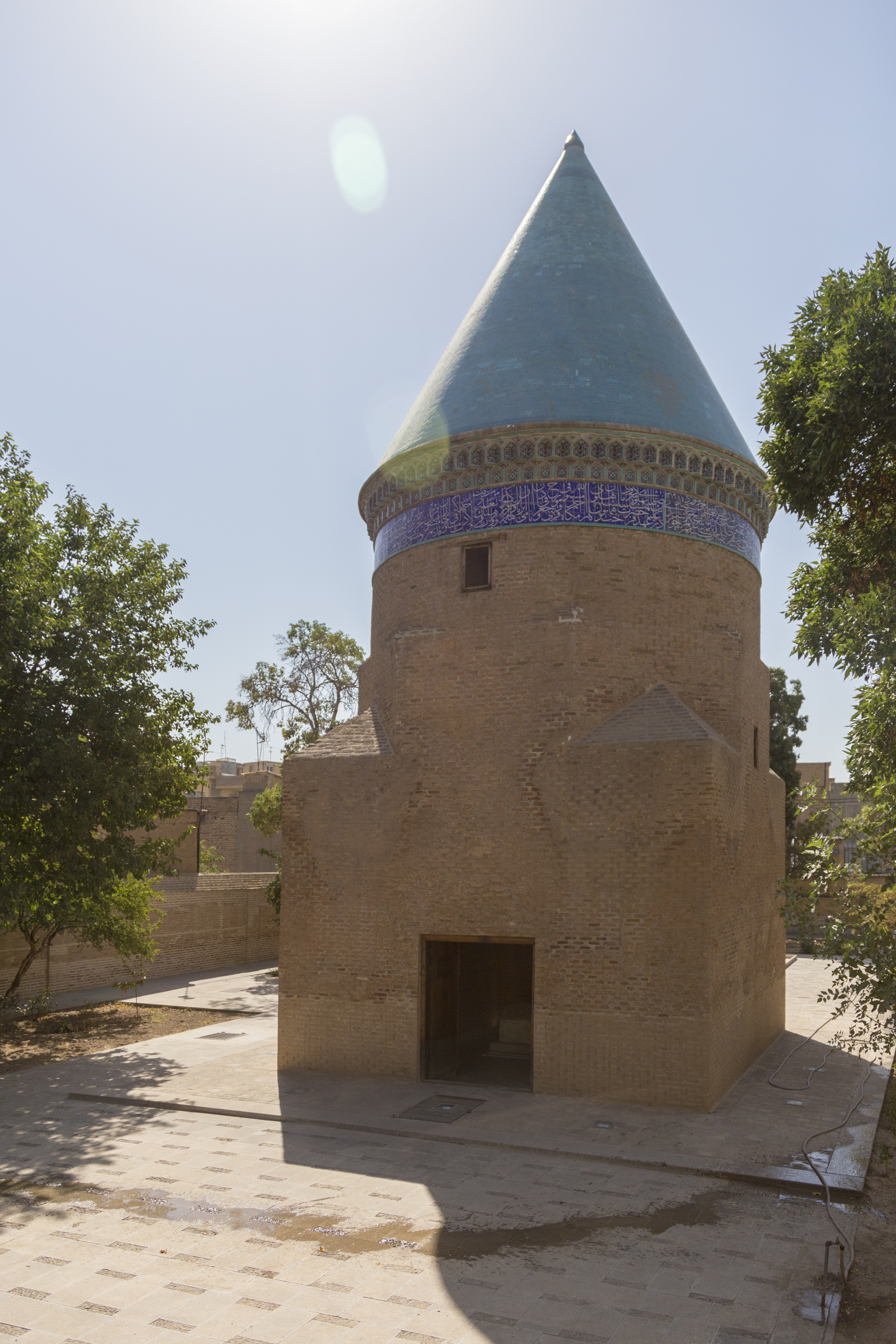
Tomb of Hamdallah Mustawfi, built in the 14th century

Mangu Qa'an appointed Iftikhar al-Din Muhammad al-Bukhari as governor of Qazvin in 1253/4 (651 AH). Iftikhar al-Din learned Mongolian and translated the Kalila wa-Dimna into Mongolian. He and his brother Imam al-Din Yahya remained in office until 1278/9 (677 AH).

Qazvin suffered during the tumultuous period preceding Ghazan Khan's rise to power in 1295. Many people left the town, to the point that Hamdallah Mustawfi wrote that Friday prayers could not be performed. He also mentioned Mongol reappropriation of waqf land in nearby Pishkildarra.

At the end of Uljaytu's reign Qazvin became administered by Husam al-Din Amir Umar Shirazi and the mustawfi Hajji Fakhr al-Din Ahmad. When Abu Sa'id Bahadur Khan took over in 1316, he assigned the income from Qazvin to cover the expenses of his mother's household.

After the fall of the Ilkhanate, Qazvin had an uneventful history until the beginning of the Safavid Empire.

=== Safavid rule ===
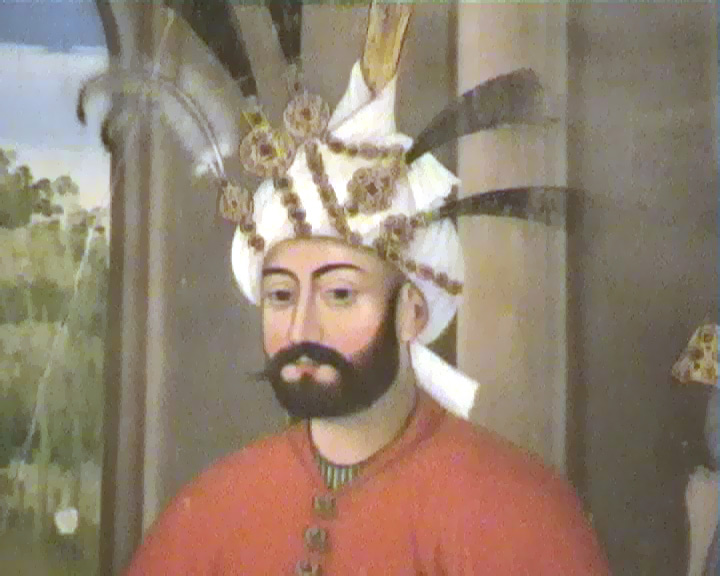
Shah Tahmasp I (1524–1576) made Qazvin the capital of the Safavid empire.

From its beginnings under Ismail I, the Safavid state had key frontiers in Azerbaijan, with the Ottoman Empire, and in Khorasan with the Uzbek tribes led by the Shaybanids. Because of Qazvin's central location on the road between these two regions, its strategic importance increased under the Safavids. In 1555, after temporarily losing his original capital of Tabriz to the Ottomans, Tahmasp I moved his capital to the more secure location of Qazvin. Qazvin remained capital until Abbas I moved the capital to Isfahan about half a century later. While it was the capital, Qazvin bore the title dār al-salṭana.

Like many other cities in Iran, Qazvin became divided into Haydari and Ne'mati factions during the Safavid period. The Italian traveller Vicento d'Alessandri visited Qazvin during the reign of Tahmasp I and reported that 4 of Qazvin's districts belonged to one group and 5 belonged to the other, and the two had been hostile to one another for at least 30 years by that point with frequent conflicts between the two.

Widespread public conversion to Twelver Shi'ism probably took place during the early Safavid period, but many people probably secretly remained Sunnis for some time. The Nuqqawi heresy spread to Qazvin during the reign of Tahmasp I. The local leader was Darvīsh Khusrāw, who came from a family of muqannis (qanat builders) and had associated with the Nuqqawis for a while before returning to Qazvin. The ulama, concerned with his growing popularity, charged him with heresy and banned him from the mosque where he had been living at. After Tahmasp's death, he returned to preaching, but he was eventually charged with heresy again and executed in 1593/4 (1002 AH).

Qazvin was also a mercantile center during this period. There was an increase in European merchants coming through southern Russia, and in 1561 Anthony Jenkinson noted the presence of merchants from India as well. The English merchant Arthur Edwards made several trips to Qazvin for the Muscovy Company; he wrote in 1567 that it was a producer of velvet and other goods but not as high in quality as elsewhere, and in 1569 he wrote that there were many spices sold in its markets but again they were not as good as elsewhere, and they went for such a high price that buying them here would be unprofitable.

After Tahmasp's death, Turkoman rebels seized Qazvin and installed his son Tahmasp Mirza as a puppet ruler in the city for a while. In the spring of 1596, Hamza Mirza marched on Qazvin and overthrew the Turkomans. Qazvin appears to have emerged relatively unscathed from this drama – Don Juan of Persia, who visited the city soon after, described it as large and prosperous. He wrote that it had over 100,000 heads of households, or upwards of 450,000 people in total, with over 500 mosques and a "sumptuous" palace quarter. A member of Anthony Shirley's entourage, which arrived in Qazvin in December 1598, was less enthusiastic and wrote that it was an unremarkable city except for a few mosques and the palace gate; he estimated its population as a somewhat smaller than London's.

In 1607, the Catholic priest Paul Simon wrote that Qazvin, though no longer the capital, was still a large city rivalling Isfahan in size. He said it was an important commercial destination for silks, carpets, and brocades. Pietro della Valle, who visited Qazvin in 1618, was not very impressed with the city and wrote that it had "nothing to satisfy the expectations of a royal residence". Thomas Herbert, writing in 1627, said Qazvin was "equal for grandeur to any other city in the Persian Empire", except for Isfahan, and estimated its population at 200,000. About a decade later, Adam Olearius offered a lower estimate of 100,000 people. In 1674, Jean Chardin visited Qazvin, and he wrote that its walls were in ruins by that time and it had lost its grandeur. He estimated that it had 12,000 houses and 100,000 people. He wrote that there were "a great many merchants in Qazvin, but not many rich ones" and commented on its shoe-makers, who he said made "the best shoes in the whole country" out of shagreen and coming in green, white, and other colors. There were also artisans who made gilded horse saddles and bows.

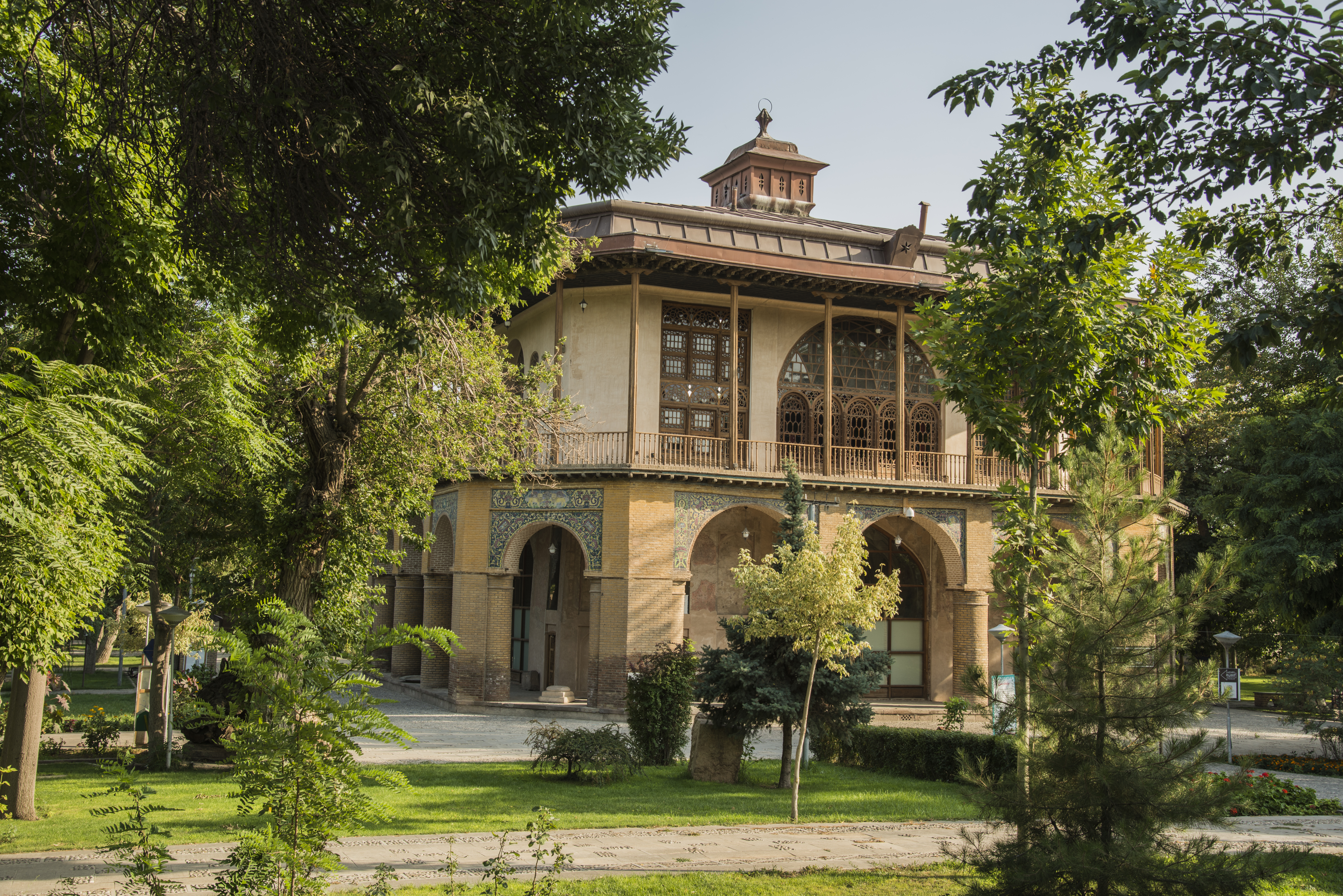
The Chehel Sotun pavilion formed part of the Safavid palace complex in Qazvin.

There was an outbreak of plague in Qazvin in 1635/6 (1045 AH).

The original Safavid palace complex is located at what is now the city's maidan or central square. Two parts of this now survive: the Chehel Sotun pavilion, which now hosts the Qazvin museum, and the monumental Ali Qapu portal which now serves as the city's police headquarters. The palace complex was probably originally at the northern end of the city - earlier monuments are all to the south and west - but over time the city expanded to the north and the palace precinct ended up in the center of the later Safavid city. This probably happened after the royal court moved to Isfahan under Abbas I in 1596/7 (1005 AH).

The Chehel Sotun pavilion is typically attributed to Tahmasp I, although this is not confirmed because there is no inscription. Shah Ismail II was enthroned here in 1576, with a grand reception held in its main hall on 22 August of that year. Mohammad Khodabandeh was probably also enthroned here, and Abbas I was also enthroned here in 1587/8 (996 AH).

After Shah Abbas moved the capital to Isfahan in 1596/7 (1005 AH), Qazvin did not become a provincial capital. Instead, it was governed by a wazir, darugha, kalantar, and mustawfi appointed directly by the central government. Qazvin only became a provincial capital during the latter part of Shah Soltan Hosayn's rule in the early 1700s. Based on the small contingent assigned to its governor - 300 soldiers - it does not seem to have been considered an important province.

The tumultuous final years of the Safavid dynasty had a negative impact on Qazvin. Its population decreased, which was at least partly because of a decline in commerce. In 1722, Qazvin surrendered to an Afghan force of 6,000 soldiers under Aman Allah Khan, but in January 1723 there was a popular uprising (or lūṭibāzār) against them in all quarters of the city, led by the kalantars. The Afghans lost 2,000 men and were forced to retreat to Isfahan. Then in 1726, Qazvin surrendered to the Ottomans on the condition that the Ottomans would not send troops to the city - which the Ottomans promptly disregarded and sent 12,000 troops along with their appointed governor Ali Pasha. The troops were soon driven out of Qazvin. Writing in 1744, the English travller Jonas Hanway wrote that a Persian merchant had told him that there had formerly been 12,000 houses in Qazvin, but by then there were only 1,100.

=== Qajar era ===
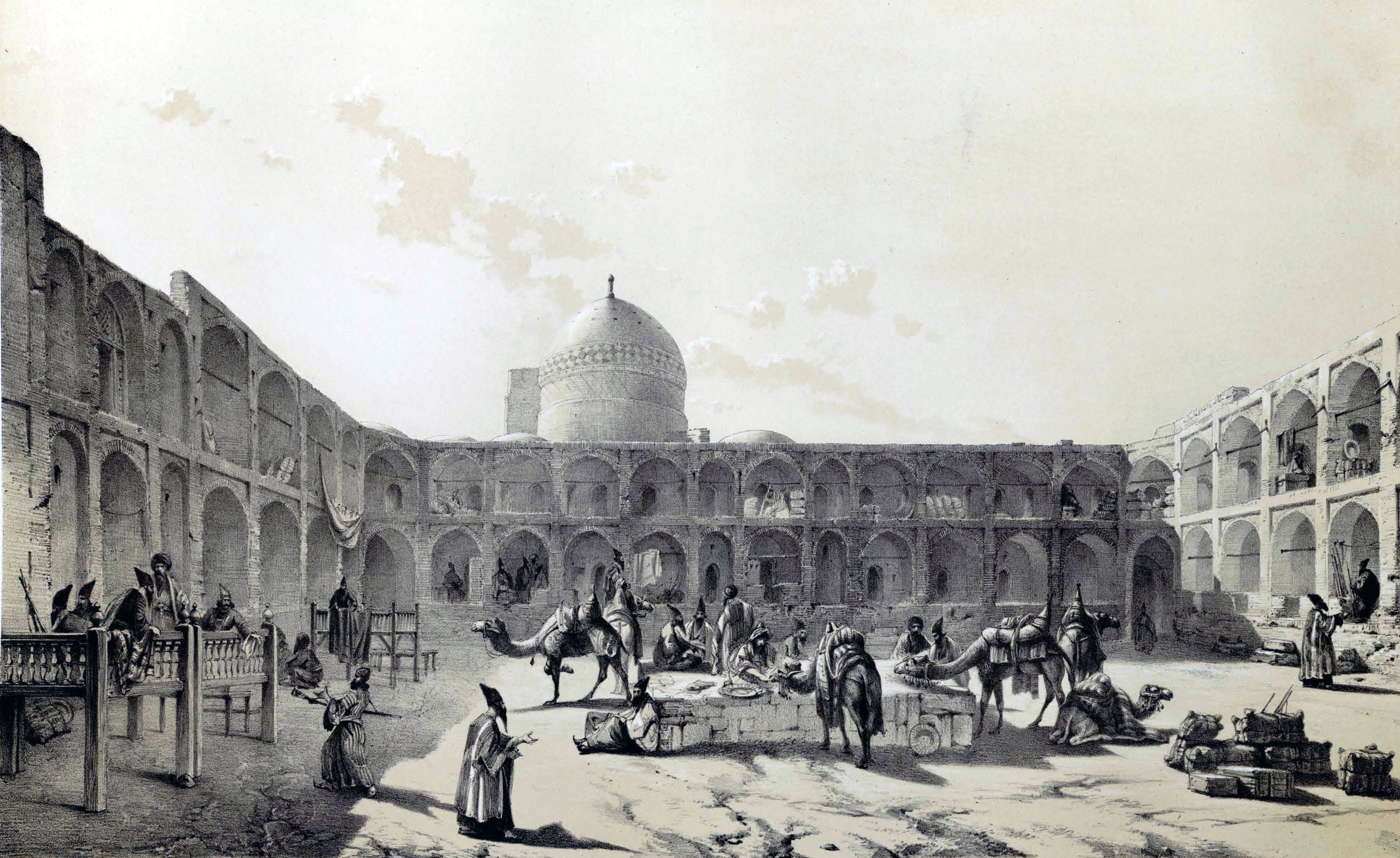
Caravanserai-i-Shah, Qazvin by Eugène Flandin

By the beginning of the 19th century, Qazvin was again starting to flourish as a center of trade. Commercial traffic on the Caspian Sea was growing, and Qazvin was one of the main centers of activity – in the words of one traveller in 1801, it was "the mart of all the commerce of the Caspian". Qazvin's importance as a commercial entrepôt was helped by the fact that it lay at a three-way crossroads: it connected Tehran, the new Qajar capital; Tabriz, "the second city of the empire", and the important Caspian port of Anzali. Qazvin was manufacturing velvets, brocades, and cotton cloth. In an 1841 report, the British diplomat Keith Edward Abbott wrote that Qazvin was commercially as important as Tehran. Mirza Husayn Farahani, who visited Qazvin in 1884, wrote that it was divided into 17 districts and had 600 shops, 8 caravanserais, 40 mosques, 9 madrasas, and 12 yakhchals. Its walls were in ruins but 12 gates were still standing.

This increase in commercial importance does not seem to have been accompanied by an increase in population, although it's hard to tell for sure because contemporary estimates were not necessarily based on the same criteria. James Justinian Morier and William Ouseley in the early 1800s both gave an estimate of 25,000 people. The census taken from 1880 to 1882 gave a population of 64,362 for Qazvin. Farahani in 1884 wrote that Qazvin had 30,000 people in about 7,000 households. George Curzon wrote that Qazvin's population was said to be 40,000 in 1889, but he wrote that its actual population was probably no more than 2/3 of that.

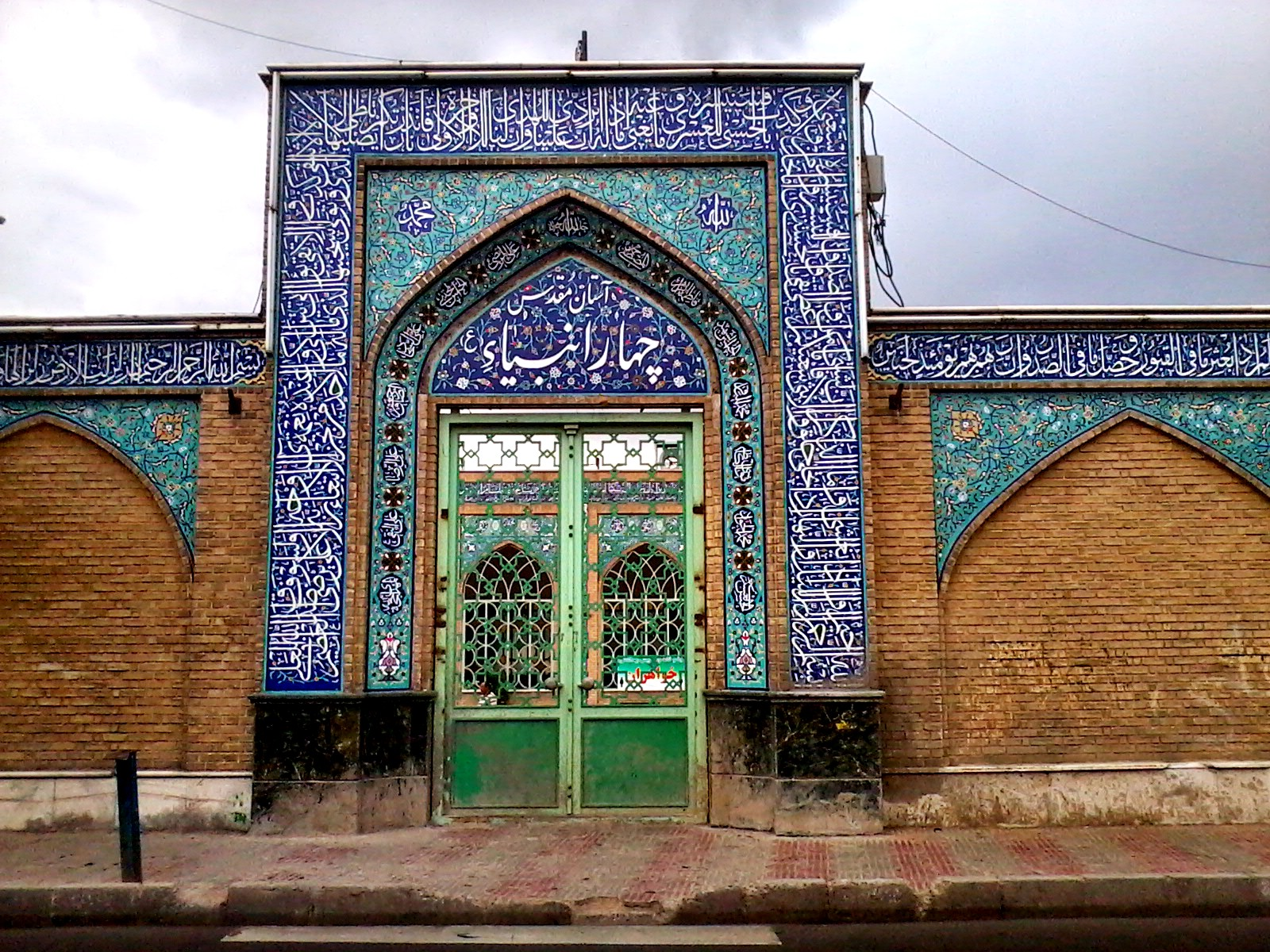
Peighambariyeh, burial place of four Jewish saints: Salam, Solum, al-Qiya, and Sohuli.

In the middle of the century, the Babi movement had one of its centers here and the first massacre of Babis occurred in Qazvin in 1847. In the second half of the 19th century Qazvin was one of the centers of Russian presence in northern Iran. A detachment of the Persian Cossack Brigade under Russian officers was stationed here. From 1893 this was the headquarters of the Russian Company for Road construction in Persia which connected Qazvin by roads to Tehran and Hamadan. The company built a hospital and the St. Nicolas Church.

=== 20th century to present ===
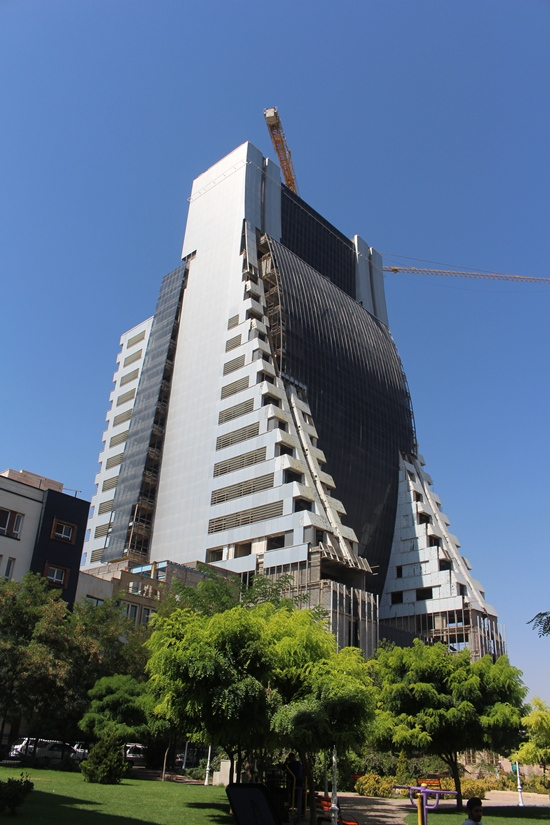
Tejarat Tower

In 1920 Qazvin was used as a base for the British Norperforce. The 1921 Persian coup d'état that led to the rise of the Pahlavi dynasty was launched from Qazvin.

During the reign of Reza Shah, Qazvin declined in importance as a commercial center as communications improved. Many merchants and other residents moved to Tehran.

On 1 September 1962, an earthquake measuring 6.9 on the Richter Scale struck Qazvin, killing more than 12,000 people. The earthquake occurred shortly before Israeli Minister of Agriculture, Moshe Dayan, was scheduled to visit Iran in mid-September for meetings with the Shah and with his Iranian counterpart, in order to discuss Israel's possible role in the White Revolution, a plan for land reform and the modernization of rural Iran. Shortly after the earthquake, two planning experts were sent from Israel to assist with Iranian relief activities. After touring the region and meeting with the Iranian minister in charge of relief efforts, they were assigned to rebuild the village of Khuznin, located in the center of the Qazvin region. Other teams, both Iranian and foreign, had also arrived in the region to offer assistance and expertise in the reconstruction activities. Each team was assigned one or more villages for planning and rebuilding. Over the course of three months, the Israeli team built hundreds of houses in the village that they had been allocated.

In 1963, the Qazvin Development Authority was established to develop the agriculture and water resources of Qazvin and its surroundings.

The city of Qazvin became the capital of the new province of Qazvin in May of 1997. On 15 July 2009 Caspian Airlines Flight 7908 crashed near Qazvin. In autumn of 2015 portions of Qazvin were struck by a meteorite, and in the same year, the city annexed the villages of Chubin Dar, Hasanabad, Kheyrabad, Mashaldar, Najafabad, Naserabad, Shahrak-e Danesh, and Vosuqabad.

== Demographics ==
=== Language ===
The majority of the people of the city of Qazvin are Persians. The majority language is Persian. Iranian Azerbaijanis and Tats are the other ethnic groups of the city of Qazvin. They speak Iranian Azerbaijani and Tati respectively.

=== Population ===
At the time of the 2006 National Census, the city's population was 349,821 in 96,420 households. The following census in 2011 counted 381,598 people in 114,662 households. The 2016 census measured the population of the city as 402,748 people in 127,154 households.

== Climate ==
Qazvin has a hot-summer Mediterranean climate (Köppen climate classification Csa).

Climate data for Ghazvin (1991-2020 normals, record high since 1991 and record low since 1959)
Month	Jan	Feb	Mar	Apr	May	Jun	Jul	Aug	Sep	Oct	Nov	Dec	Year
Record high °C (°F)	16.8 (62.2)	22.0 (71.6)	30.0 (86.0)	32.4 (90.3)	36.4 (97.5)	41.3 (106.3)	42.5 (108.5)	41.9 (107.4)	38.0 (100.4)	32.8 (91.0)	26.5 (79.7)	21.2 (70.2)	42.5 (108.5)
Mean daily maximum °C (°F)	7.0 (44.6)	9.6 (49.3)	15.1 (59.2)	20.6 (69.1)	26.4 (79.5)	33.0 (91.4)	35.8 (96.4)	35.2 (95.4)	31.0 (87.8)	23.9 (75.0)	14.6 (58.3)	9.0 (48.2)	21.8 (71.2)
Daily mean °C (°F)	1.0 (33.8)	3.3 (37.9)	8.0 (46.4)	13.1 (55.6)	18.2 (64.8)	24.0 (75.2)	26.6 (79.9)	25.9 (78.6)	21.7 (71.1)	15.5 (59.9)	8.0 (46.4)	3.1 (37.6)	14.0 (57.3)
Mean daily minimum °C (°F)	−3.7 (25.3)	−1.9 (28.6)	2.0 (35.6)	6.5 (43.7)	10.5 (50.9)	15.1 (59.2)	17.9 (64.2)	17.3 (63.1)	13.4 (56.1)	8.5 (47.3)	2.8 (37.0)	−1.3 (29.7)	7.3 (45.1)
Record low °C (°F)	−24.0 (−11.2)	−19.0 (−2.2)	−13.0 (8.6)	−7.0 (19.4)	−1.9 (28.6)	6.0 (42.8)	9.0 (48.2)	8.0 (46.4)	3.0 (37.4)	−3.0 (26.6)	−13.0 (8.6)	−19.0 (−2.2)	−24.0 (−11.2)
Average precipitation mm (inches)	34.9 (1.37)	39.3 (1.55)	48.2 (1.90)	55.8 (2.20)	29.8 (1.17)	4.1 (0.16)	3.6 (0.14)	2.6 (0.10)	1.2 (0.05)	21.8 (0.86)	39.3 (1.55)	38.7 (1.52)	319.3 (12.57)
Average precipitation days (≥ 1.0 mm)	5.7	5.9	7.1	7.5	5.5	1.2	0.7	0.4	0.5	3	5.7	5.7	48.9
Average rainy days	4.9	7	9.4	11	7.8	2.3	1.4	0.7	0.7	5.7	8.7	7.4	67
Average snowy days	5.7	4.5	2.1	0.1	0	0	0	0	0	0.1	0.7	3.6	16.8
Average relative humidity (%)	70	64	55	56	51	39	40	39	41	49	63	70	53
Average dew point °C (°F)	−4.5 (23.9)	−3.8 (25.2)	−1.8 (28.8)	3.2 (37.8)	6.4 (43.5)	7.5 (45.5)	9.9 (49.8)	8.8 (47.8)	5.9 (42.6)	3.1 (37.6)	0.3 (32.5)	−2.3 (27.9)	2.7 (36.9)
Mean monthly sunshine hours	162	170	201	226	286	344	353	350	308	251	180	155	2,986
Source: NOAA NCEI (Note: Rainy days calculated using parameter codes 46, 69 and 71)(snow days 1981-2010)

== Main sights ==
Qazvin contains several archeological excavations. In the middle of the city lie the ruins of Meimoon Ghal'eh, one of several Sasanian edifices in the area.

Qazvin contains several buildings from the Safavid era, dating to the period in which it was the capital of Iran. A well known of the surviving edifices is the Chehel sotoun, today a museum in central Qazvin.

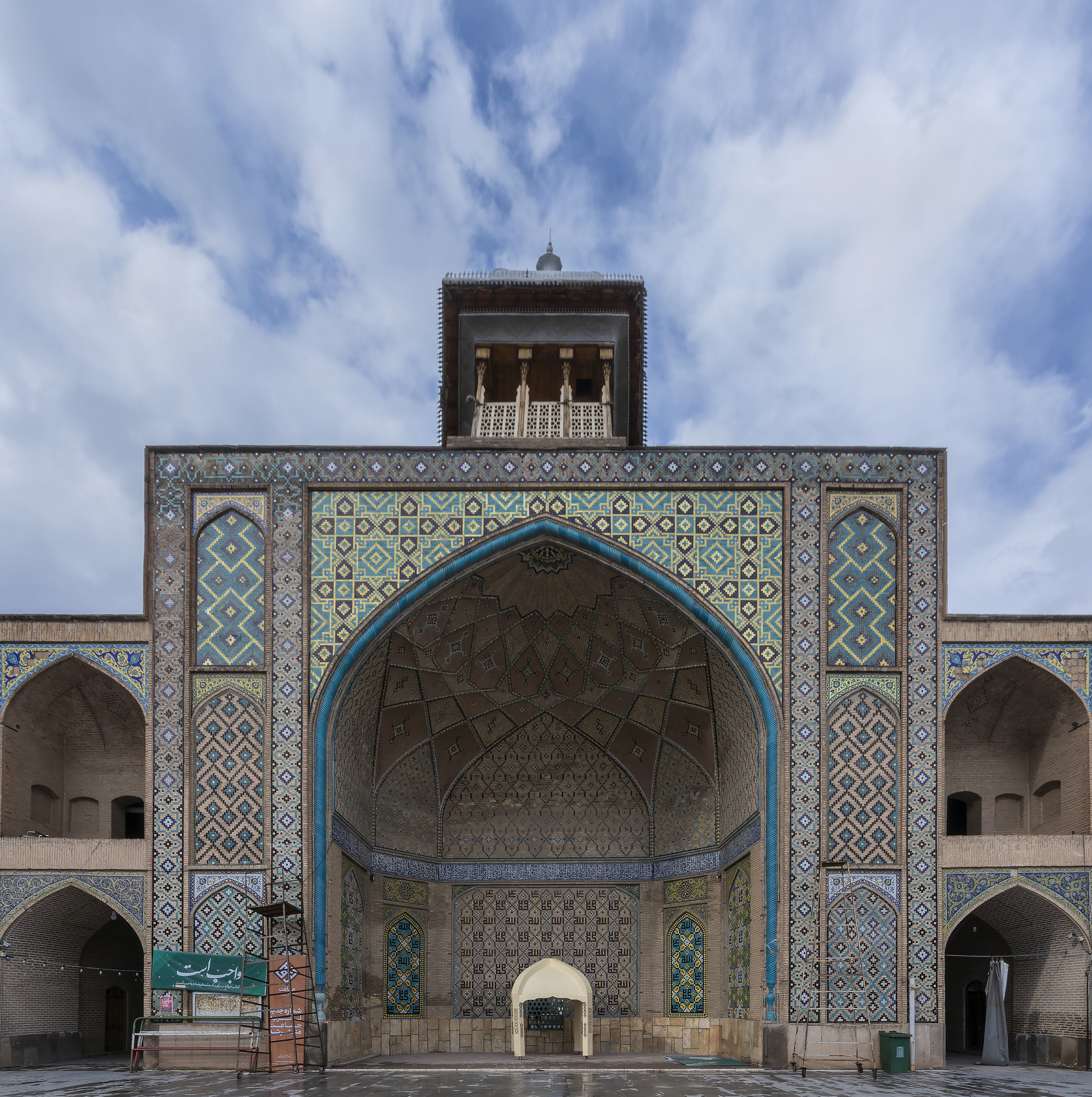
Entrance of Masjed al-Nabi, Qazvin

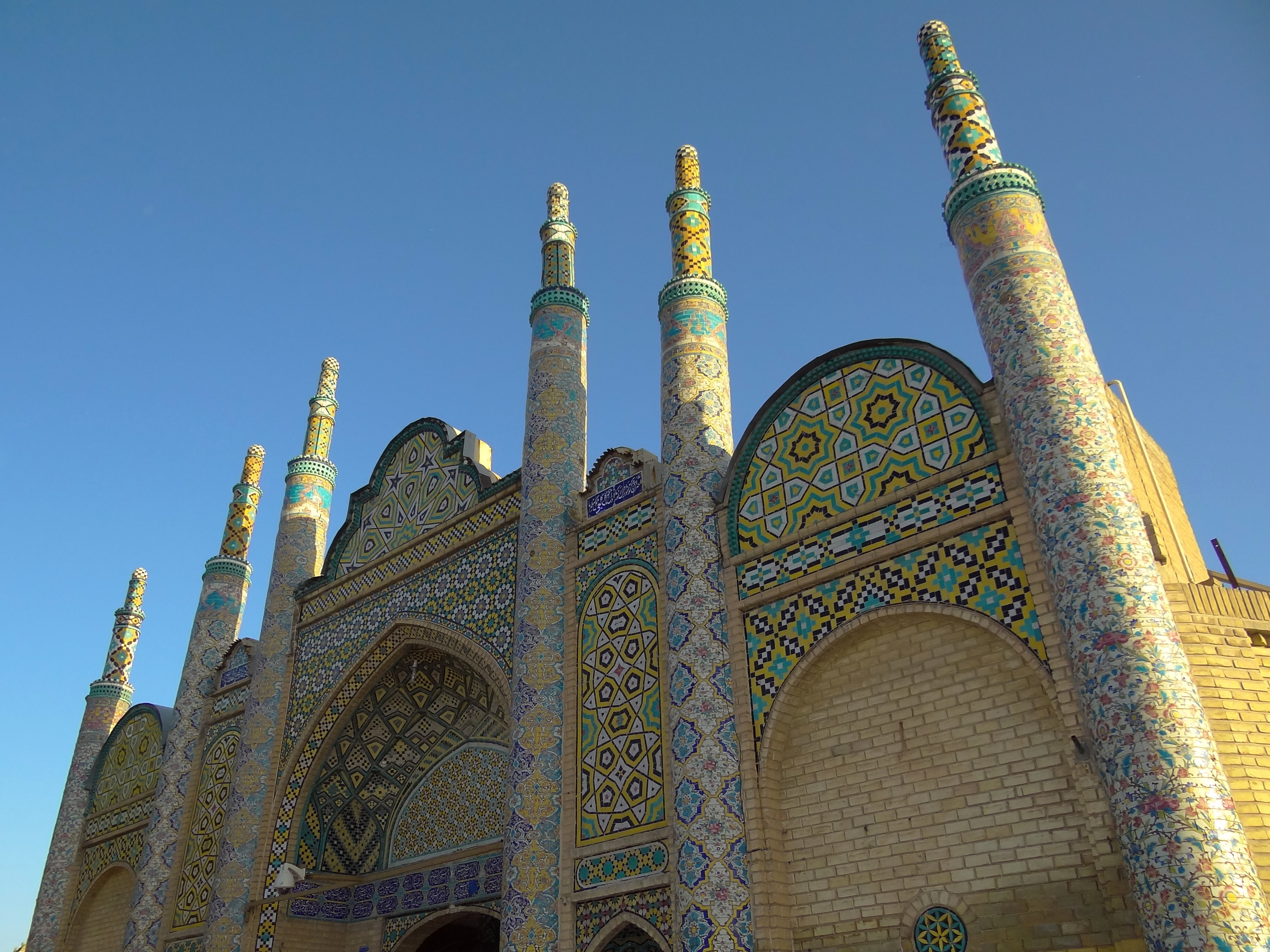
Salaamgaah, Qazvin

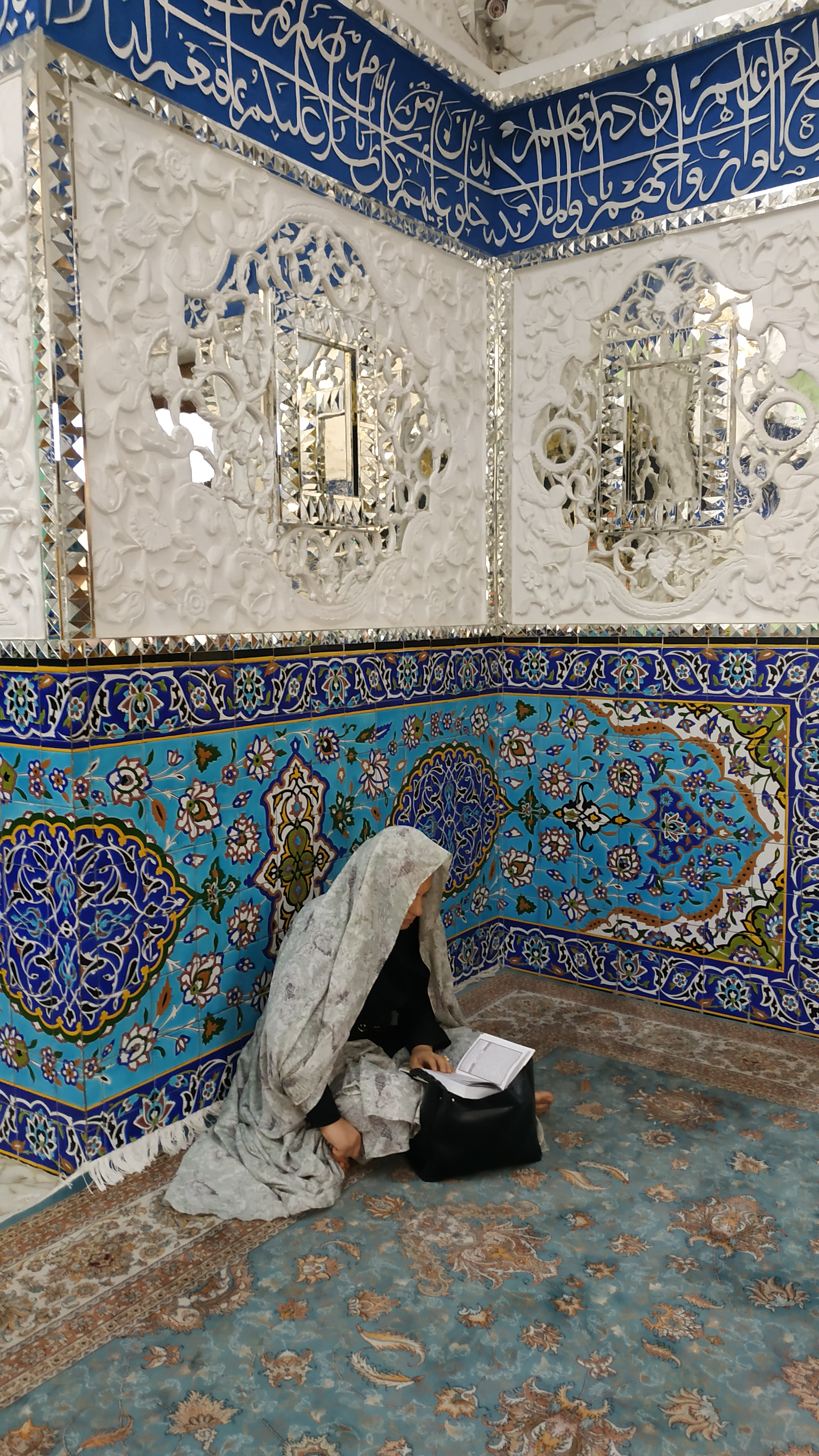
Woman praying in a mosque in Qazvin

In the Islamic era, the popularity of mystics (tasawwuf), as well as the prominence of tradition (Hadith), religious jurisprudence (fiqh), and philosophy in Qazvin, led to the emergence of many mosques and religious schools. They include:

- Jame' Atiq Mosque of Qazvin
- Heydarieh Mosque
- Masjed Al-Nabi (Soltani Mosque): With an area of 14000 m^{2}, this mosque is one of the most glorious mosques of antiquity, built in the Safavieh's monarchy era.
- Sanjideh Mosque: Another mosque of Qazvin dating back to pre-Islamic Iran; a former fire temple. Its present-day form is attributed to the Seljukian era.
- Panjeh Ali Mosque: A former place of worship for royal harem members in the Safavid period.
- Peighambarieh School-Mosque: Founded 1644 according to inscription.
- Peighambarieh Shrine: Where four Jewish saints who foretold the coming of Christ, are buried.
- Molla Verdikhani School-Mosque: Founded in 1648.
- Salehieh Madrasa and Mosque: Founded in 1817 by Mulla Muhammad Salih Baraghani.
- Sheikhol Islam School-Mosque: Renovated in 1903.
- Eltefatieh School: Dating back to the Il-Khanid period.
- Sardar School- Mosque: Made by two brothers Hossein Khan and Hassan Khan Sardar in 1815, as a fulfillment of their promise if they came back victorious from a battle against the Russians.
- Shazdeh Hosein Shrine; a c. 15th century shrine to a c. 9th century Shiite saint.
- Aminiha Hosseiniyeh

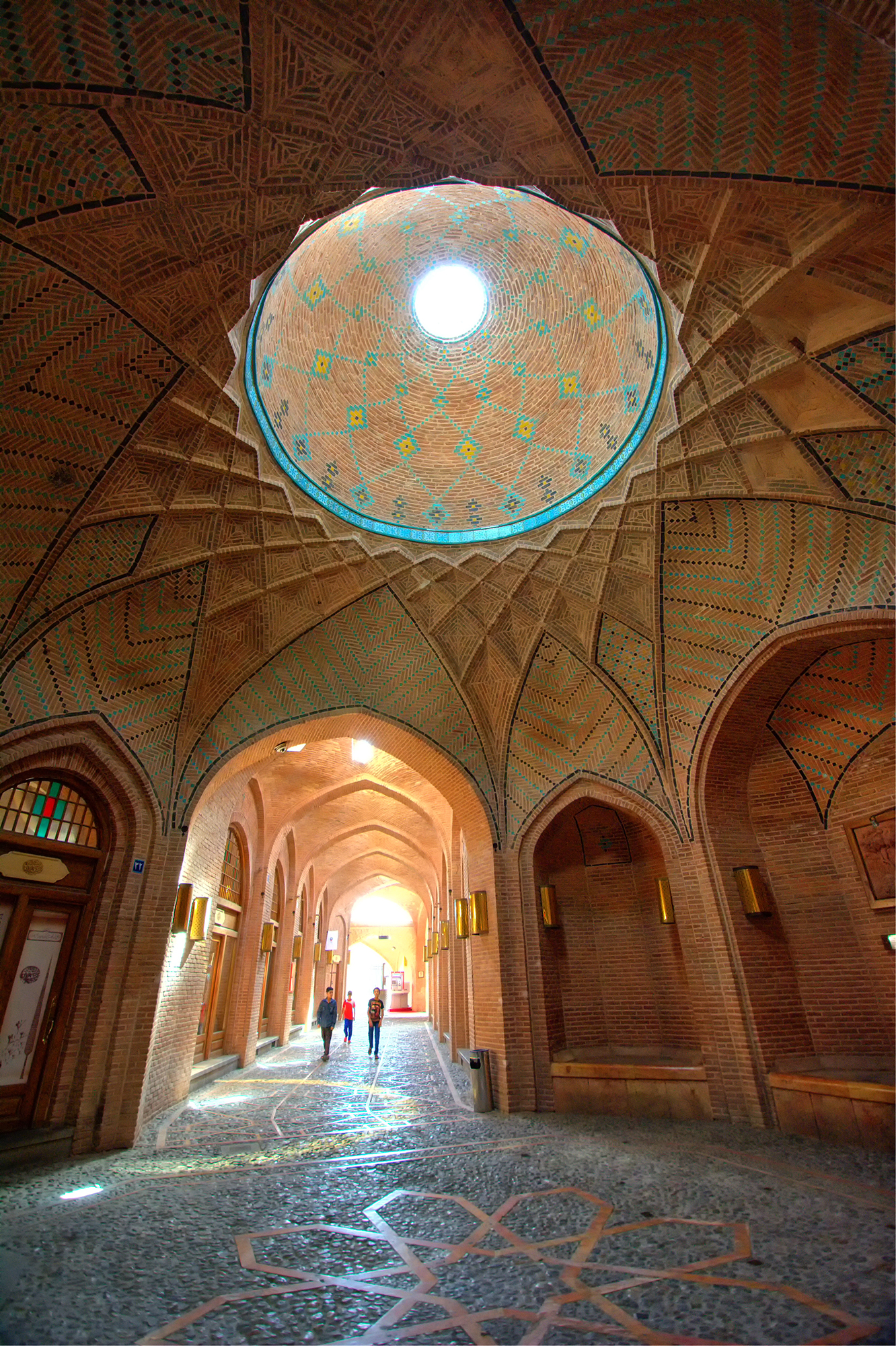
The Qajar-era Caravanserai of Sa'd al-Saltaneh

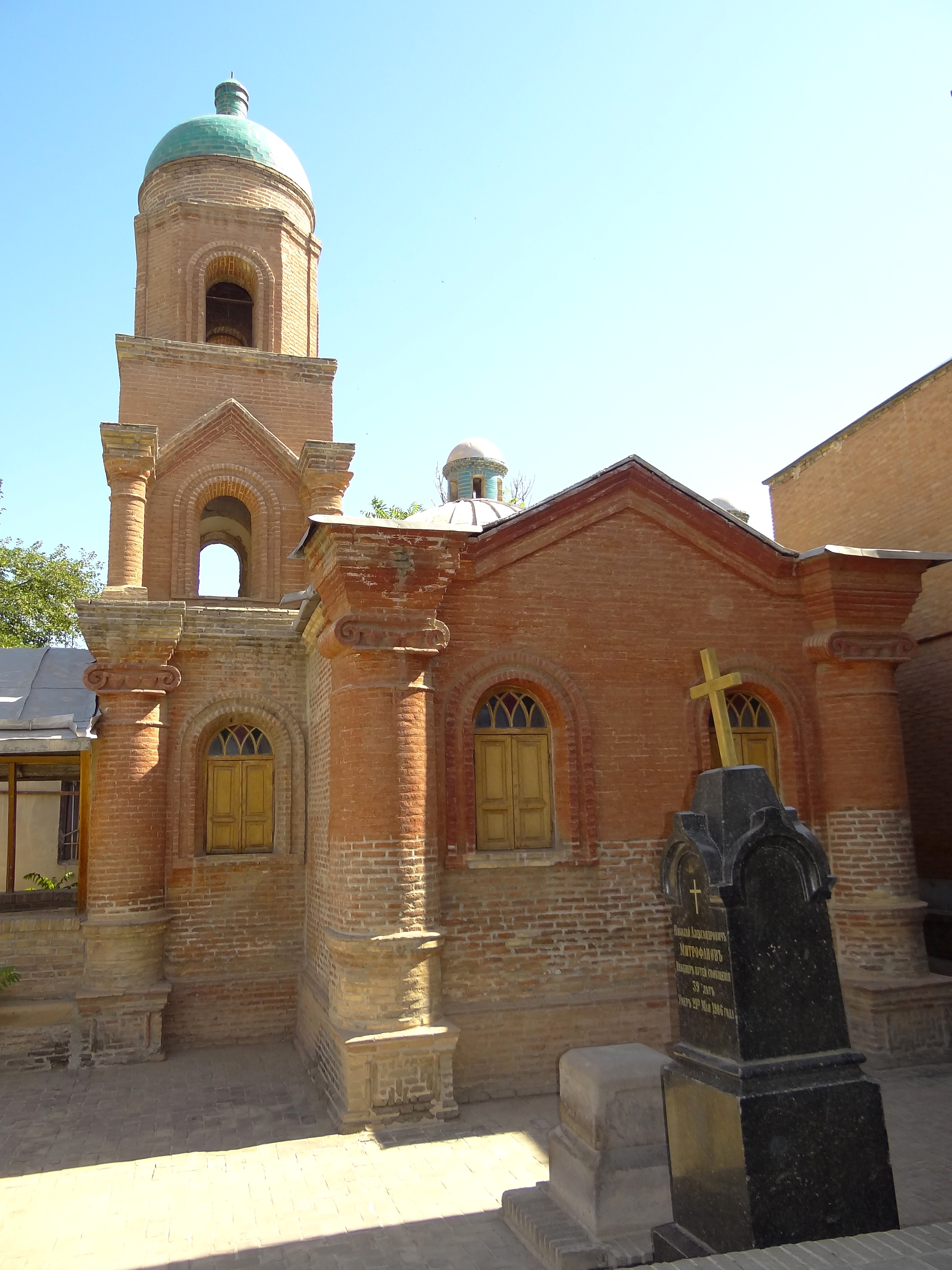
The Russian Church of Qazvin today sits adjacent to the campus of Islamic Azad University of Qazvin.

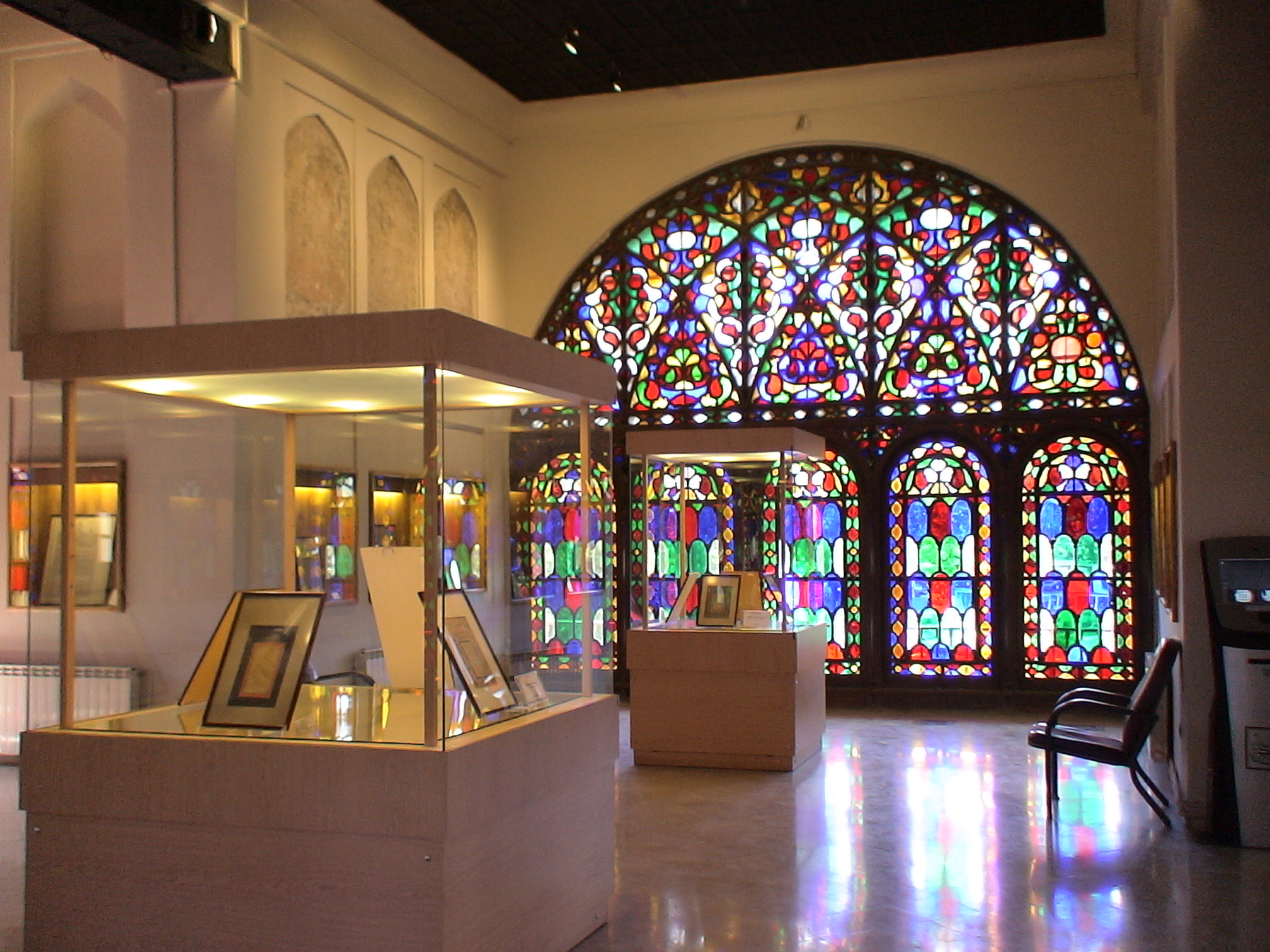
Chehel sotoun, Qazvin

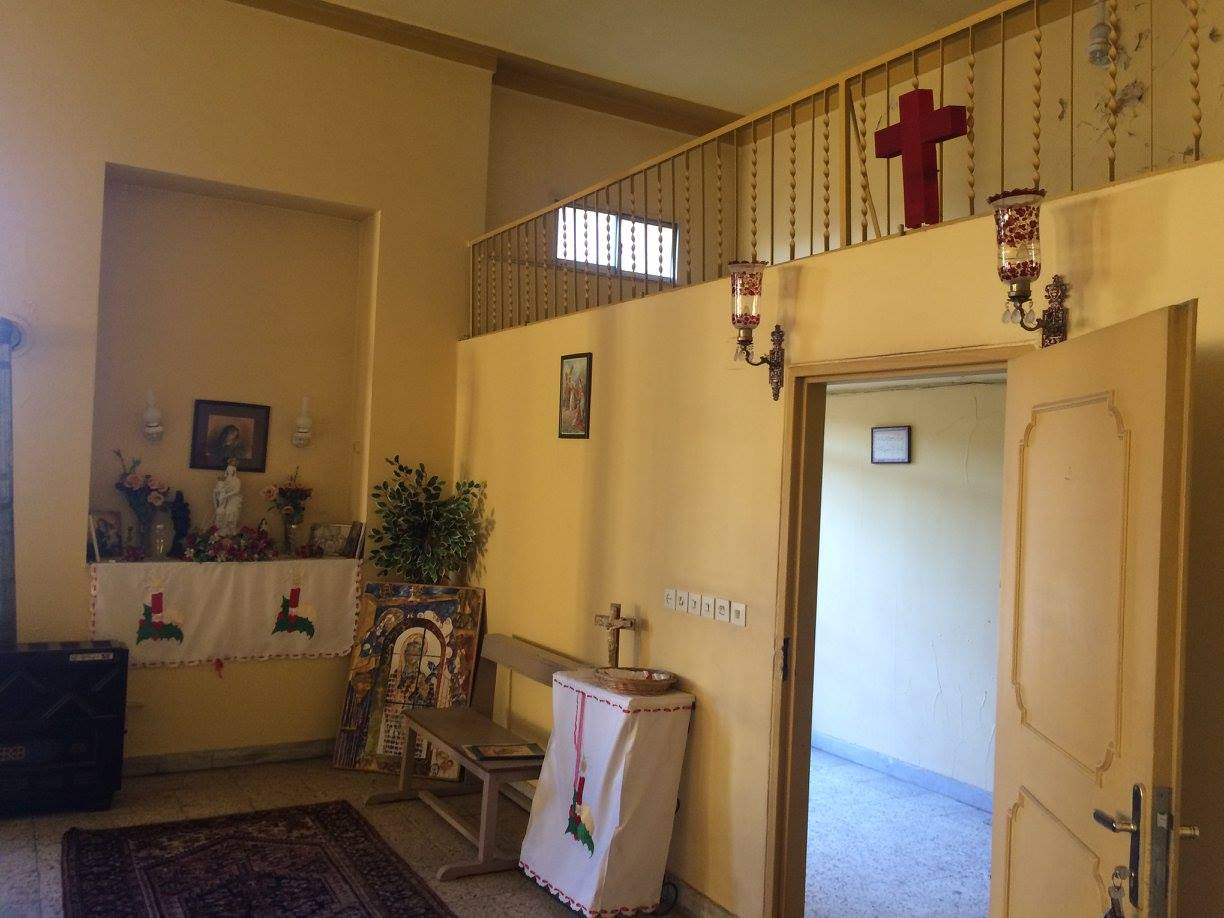
Chaldean Catholic Church of Hazrat-e Maryam

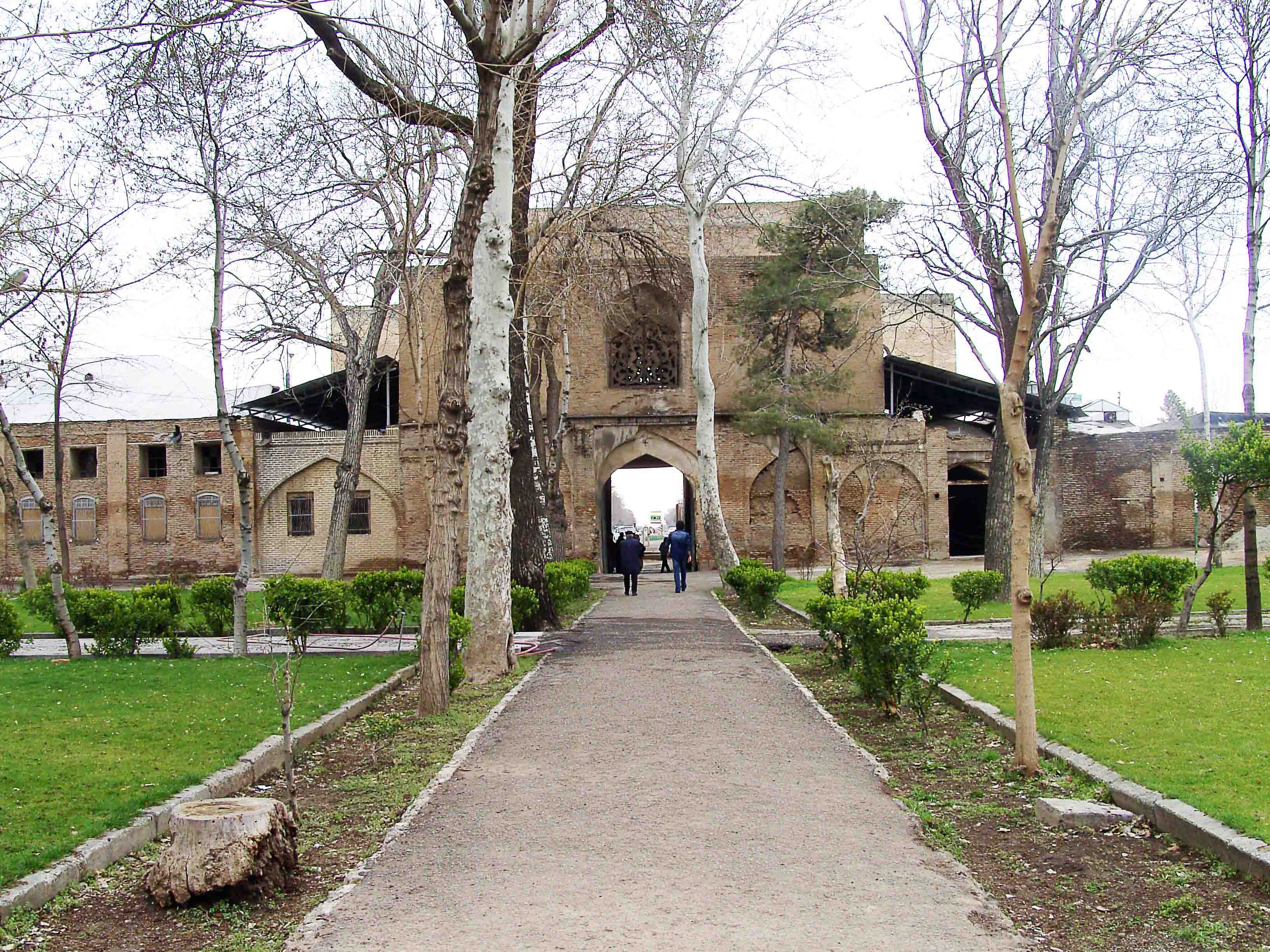
Qazvin monumental Ali Qapu gate to the Safavid palace complex

About 100 km (62 mi) south-west of Qazvin are the tombs of two Saljuki era princes — Abu Saeed Bijar, son of Sa'd, and Abu Mansur Iltai, son of Takin — located in two separate towers known as the Kharraqan twin towers. Constructed in 1067, these were the first monuments in Islamic architecture to include a non-conic two-layered dome. Both towers were severely damaged by a devastating earthquake in March 2003.

Sepah Street (خیابان سپه, pronounced "Cepah" referring to ancient Persian army and not the revolutionary guards pronounced "Sepaah") is known as the first modern street in Iran. This street entirely is carpeted with carved gray stone and is surrounded by craftsmen gift shops (used to be bars or bygone liquorshops, called May'kadeh) and hosts historical places such as Qazvin's Ali Qapu gate, entrance of Jame' Atiq mosque and historical schools.

Qazvin has three buildings built by Russians in the late 19th/early 20th century. Among these is the current Mayor's office (former Ballet Hall) and a water reservoir. St. Nicholas church was built in 1904 by the Russian Company for Roads in Persia which had its headquarter here. The church was in use until being decommissioned in 1984 because the community of Russian emigres in Qazvin did not exist any more. The iconostasis and bell was removed to Tehran and the building handed over to the Iranian government which keeps it available to the public as a historic monument. In front of the church is a 1906 memorial to a Russian road engineer.

== Economy ==
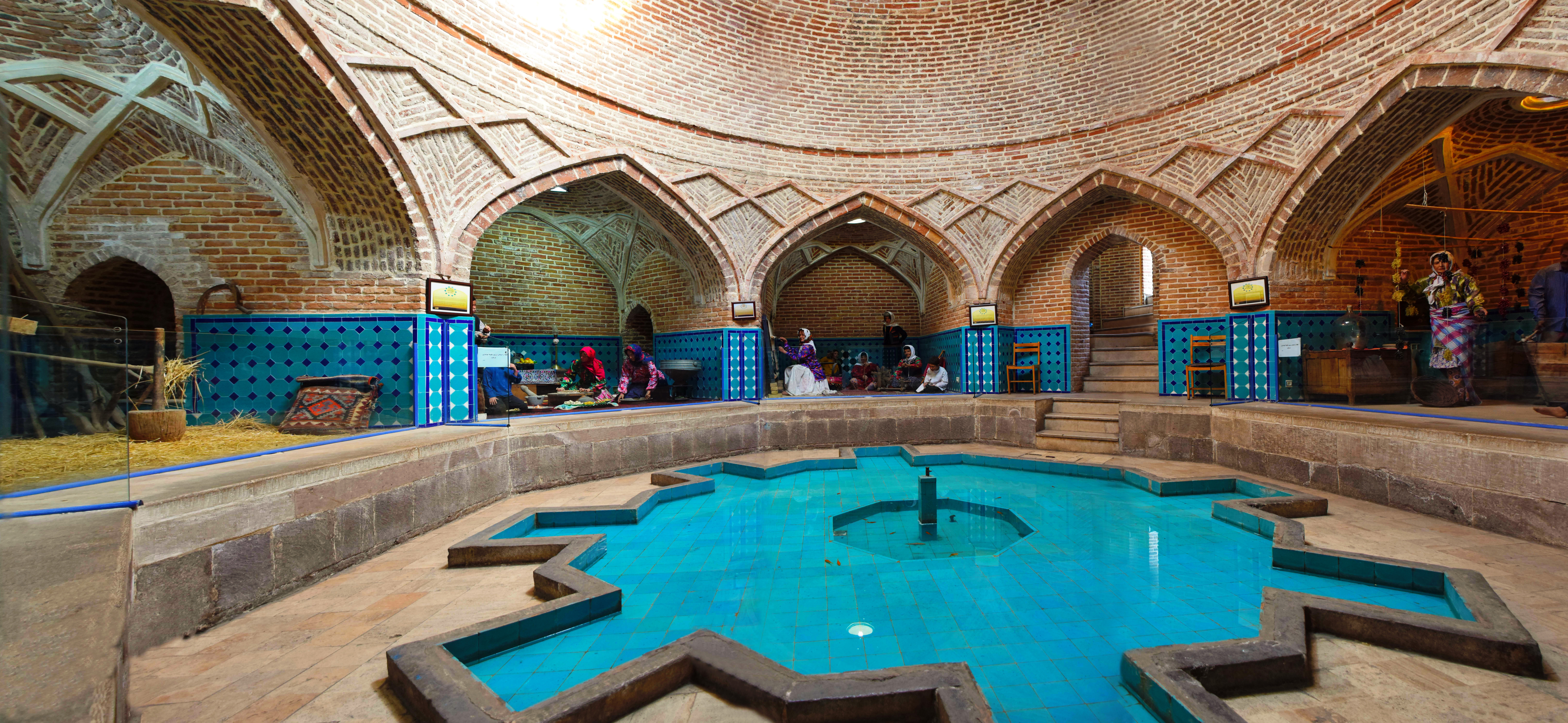
Qajar Bathhouse

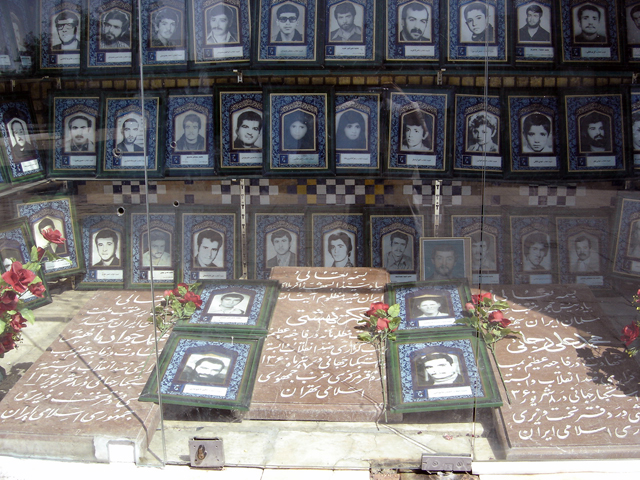
A memorial of the many Qazvinis who died during the revolution of Iran and during the Iran–Iraq War.

Qazvin today is a center of textile trade, including cotton, silk and velvet, in addition to leather. It is on the railroad line and the highway between Tehran and Tabriz. Qazvin has one of the largest power plants feeding electricity into Iran's national power grid, the Shahid Raja'i facility, which provides 7% of Iran's electrical power.

=== Colleges and universities ===
Qazvin has several institutes of higher education:

- Imam Khomeini International University
- Islamic Azad University of Qazvin
- Payam-e-Nur University of Qazvin
- Qazvin University of Medical Sciences
- Raja University
- Shahid Babaee Technical Institute
- Kar University
- Parsian Higher Education Institute
- Dehkhoda University
- Ghazali University
- Mir-Emad Higher Education Institute
- Darolfonoun University
- Allameh Ghazvini University

=== Modern towers ===
Some famous residential towers are: Punak (536 units), Aseman, Elahieh, Bademestan (440 units in 17 floors) and Tejarat tower with 28 floors.

=== Shopping complexes ===
- City Star in Khayam Street
- Ferdowsi in Ferdowsi Street
- Iranian in Adl Street
- Narvan in Ferdowsi Street
- Noor in Felestin Street
- Meh ro mah Bouali Street
- Alghadir on South Khayam Street
- Alavi on Taleghani Street

=== Bridges ===
- Naderi
- Molasadra
- Ertebatat
- Persian Gulf (Khalij Fars)
- Abotorabi
- Nasr
- Motahari
- Imam Ali
- Rajaei

=== Famous hotels ===
- Alborz
- Safir
- Mir Emad
- Iranian
- behrouzi historical house
- Iran
- Marmar
- Razhia
- Ghods(closed)
- Grand Hotel, Qazvin
- Noizar
- Minno
- Sina (new)

=== Major parks ===
- Shohada
- Dehkhoda
- Beheshti
- Fadak (Barajin)
- Mellat
- Al-Ghadir
- Afarinesh
- Molla Khalila

== Transportation ==
- Qazvin railway station
- Qazvin Airport
- Qazvin Eastern Bus terminal
- سامانه هوشمند اجاره اتوبوس و مینی بوس https://terminali.ir
- Qazvin southwestern terminal (Takestan & Hamedan)

== Sport ==
Qazvin is a well-known city because of its famous athletes. The city has highly focused on athletic teams along recent years. Techmash is a basketball team which entered Iranian Basketball Super League in 2013. Shams Azar is the local football team, playing in the Persian Gulf Pro League (First division).

This city has several important sports complexes:

- Sardare Azadegan Stadium
- Shahid Rajai Stadium
- Shahid Babaei sports complex

== Notable people ==
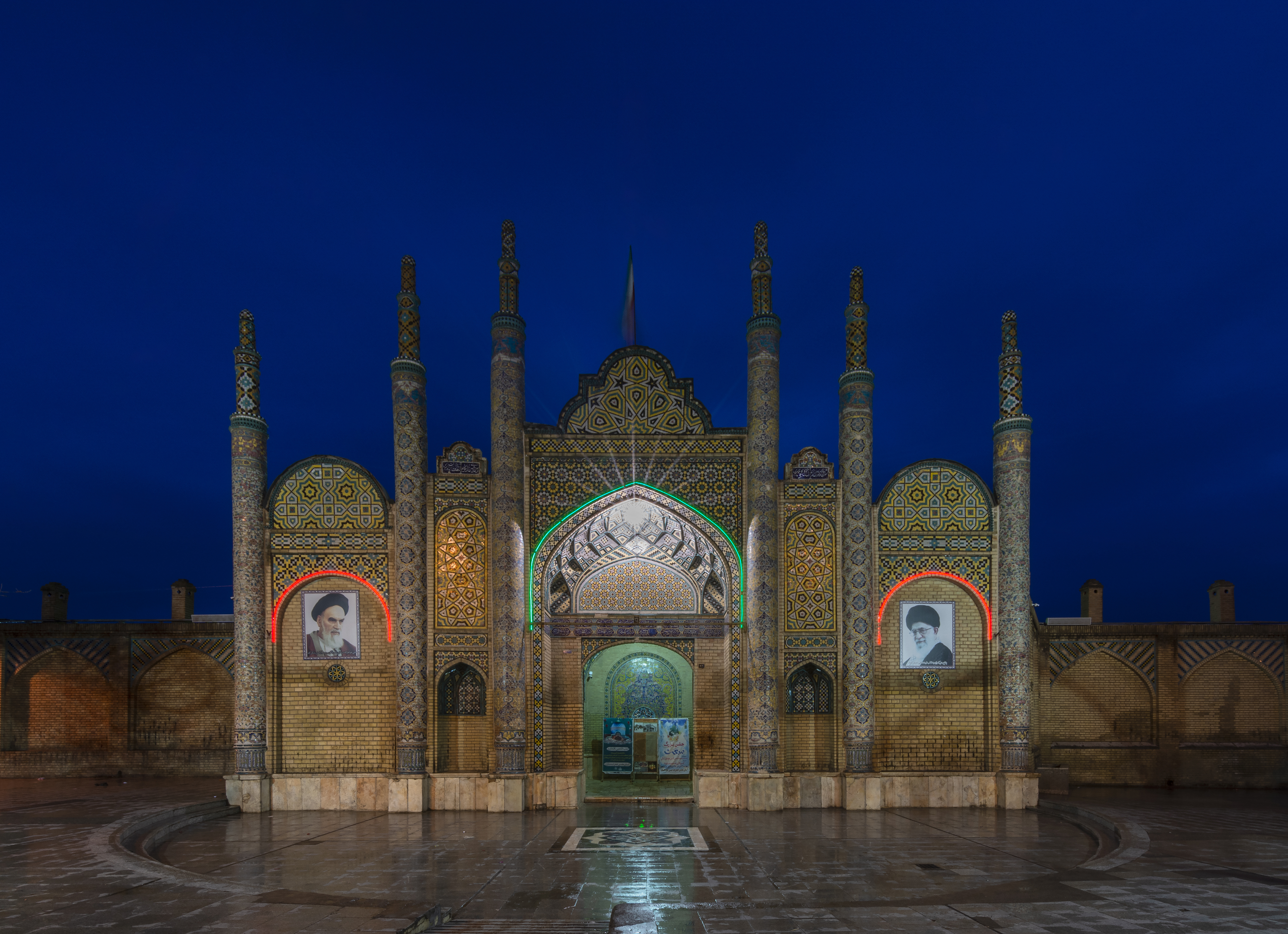
Shazdeh Hosein Shrine

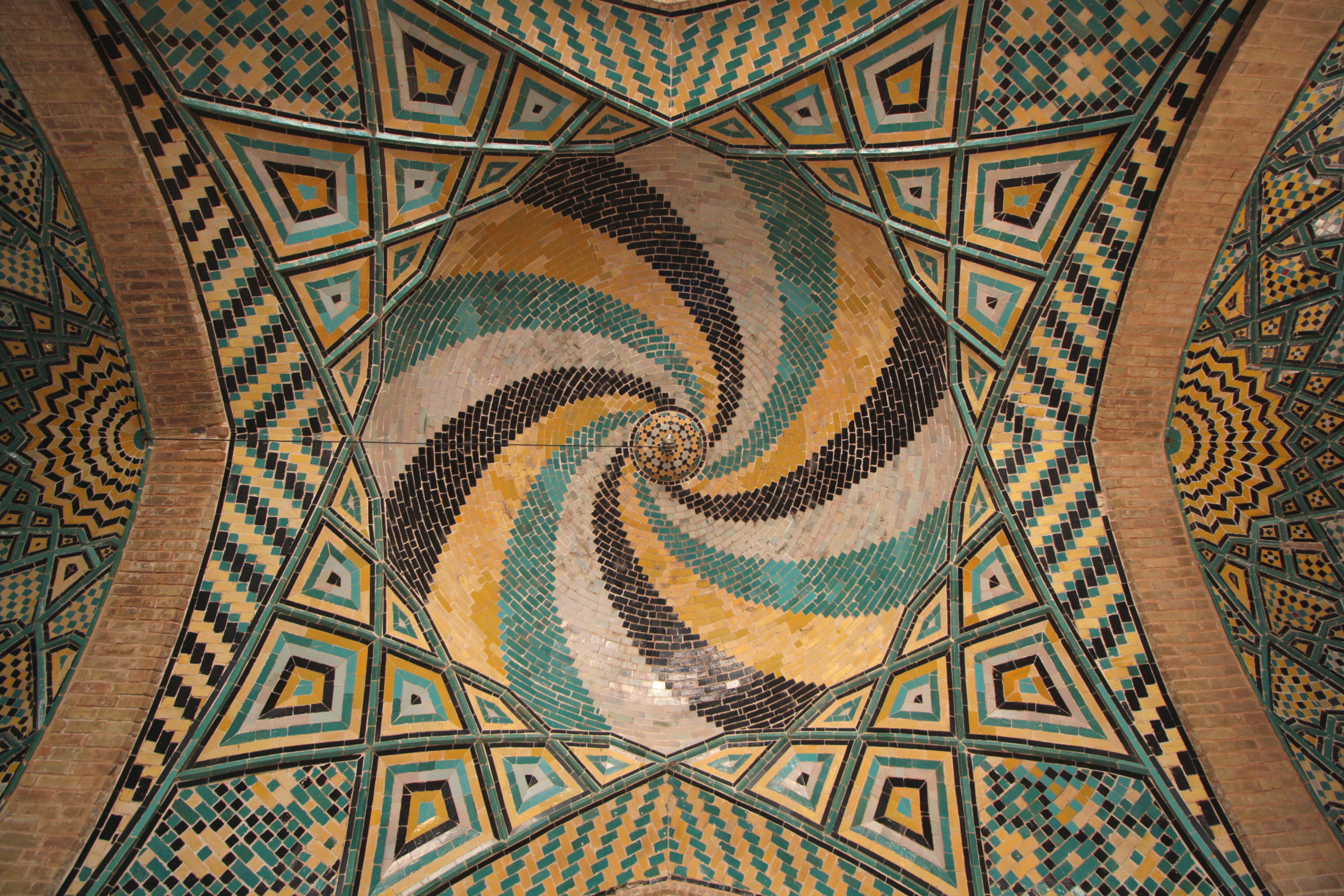
Interior of Shazdeh Hosein Shrine

=== Pre-modern times ===
- Ibn Majah, author of the last of the six canonical hadith collections recognized by Sunni Muslims
- Hamdollah Mostowfi: the great Il-Khanid historian and writer
- Zakariya Qazvini: 13th-century writer, cosmographer, and geographer
- Ubayd Zakani: famous 8th-century poet noted for his satire and obscene verses
- Mir Emad Hassani: famous Nasta'liq calligrapher
- Darvish Ablulmajid: famous Shekaste Nasta'liq calligrapher
- Mirza Mohammad-Reza Qazvini: Persian envoy of the Franco-Persian alliance

=== Modern times ===
- Yousef Alikhani: contemporary fiction writer and researcher
- Azizi family: a well-known family that originates from Qazvin includes |Sheikh Ahmad Azizi] who is buried in Peighambariyeh shrine, known research and medical doctor Dr. Sadegh Pirooz Azizi, the former Minister of Foreign Affairs from 1997 to 2005 Mr. Ahmad Azizi, hadi Azizi and Abolghasem Azizi.
- Ali Akbar Dehkhoda: prominent linguist and author of Iran's first modern Persian dictionary
- Ali Etesamifar: puppeteer
- Abdul Hossein Darki: doctor
- Goharshad Ghazvini, Persian calligrapher
- Jamal Karimi-Rad: former Minister of Justice (2005–2006).
- Hadi Mirmiran: architect
- Shirin Neshat: Famous contemporary Iranian artist
- Mojabi family: a prominent family that originates from Qazvin including Javad Mojabi and Zohreh Mojabi
- Molla Khalil Ibn Ghazi Qazvini: famous faqih (religious jurist) and commentator of the Qur'an in the Safavid period (d. 1678)
- Aref Qazvini: poet, lyricist, and musician
- Ra'ees ol-Mojahedin: The late Mirza Hassan Sheikh al-Islam, son of Mirza Masoud Sheikh al-Islam, leader of the liberals and constitutionalists of Qazvin
- Shahid Saless: killed in 1846. The third religious leader after Imam Ali who was murdered during prayer.
- Kázim-i-Samandar: a famous follower of Baháʼu'lláh, The Prophet-Founder of the Baháʼí Faith
- Monir Shahroudy Farmanfarmaian: Famous contemporary Iranian artist
- Táhirih: influential poet and theologian of the Bábí Faith
- Nasser Takmil Homayoun: contemporary historian
- Nasser Yeganeh: Chief Justice of the Supreme Court (1975–79)
- Haj seyed Javadi: politician in the early 1980s
- Abbas Babaei: Brigadier General in the Islamic Republic of Iran Air Force
- Alireza Jahanbakhsh: professional footballer who plays for Eredivisie club Feyenoord and the Iranian national team.
- Varoujan Hakhbandian: Armenian-Iranian composer

=== Buried in Qazvin ===
- Uwais Qarni: celebrity of early Islam, thought to have been killed here while fighting against an army of Deilamian origin
- Ahmad Ghazali: famous Iranian sufi who died in 1126 CE and was buried beside Shahzadeh Hossein
- Ali Ibn Shazan: great scholar of the fifth century
- Shahzadeh Hossein: Shiite saint
- Abbas Babaei

== Twin towns and cities ==
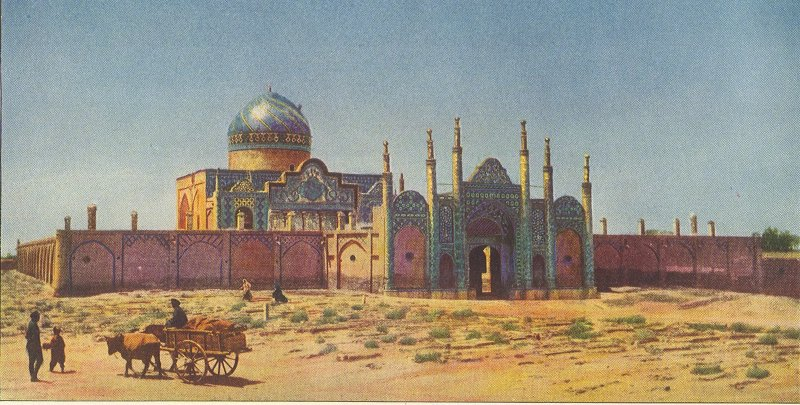
Mesjed Koucheek, Qazvin, in 1921; nowadays Shazdeh Hosein Shrine

- Évora, Portugal (2016)
- Baalbek, Lebanon (2015)
- Bishkek, Kyrgyzstan (2011)
- Denizli, Turkey (2012)
- Shah Alam, Malaysia (2011)

== See also ==
- Caspians
- List of famous ab anbars of Qazvin
- Qazwini (disambiguation), a personal name meaning "from Qazwin"
- List of governors of Qazvin

Qazvin travel guide from Wikivoyage Media related to Qazvin at Wikimedia Commons

== Sources ==
- Badiyi, Bahram (2020). "Cities and Mint Centers Founded by the Sasanians". Ancient Iranian Numismatics: 203–233.
- Lambton, A.K.S. & Hillenbrand, R. (2002). "Zand̲j̲ān". In Bearman, P. J.; Bianquis, Th.; Bosworth, C. E.; van Donzel, E. & Heinrichs, W. P. (eds.). The Encyclopaedia of Islam, Second Edition. Volume XI: W–Z. Leiden: E. J. Brill. pp. 446–447. ISBN 978-90-04-12756-2.

Preceded by Tabriz	Capital of Iran (Persia); 1555–1598	Succeeded by Isfahan
Preceded by Tabriz	Capital of Safavid dynasty 1555–1598	Succeeded by Isfahan
