= Mashaldar =

Neighborhood of Qazvin province, Iran

Mashaldar Persian: مشعلدار
- Neighborhood
- Location within Iran
- Coordinates: 36°10′41″N 50°01′01″E
- Country: Iran
- Province: Qazvin
- County: Qazvin
- District: Central
- City: Qazvin

Population (2011)
  - Total: 3,751
- Time zone: UTC+3:30 (IRST)

Mashaldar (Persian: مشعلدار) (Note: Also romanized as Mash‘aldār) is a neighborhood in the city of Qazvin in the Central District of Qazvin County, Qazvin province, Iran.

== Demographics ==
=== Population ===
At the time of the 2006 National Census, Mashaldar's population was 3,155 in 702 households, when it was a village in Pir Yusefian Rural District of the Central District in Alborz County. The following census in 2011 counted 306 people in 89 households. The village was annexed by the city of Qazvin in 2015.
