= Meimoon Ghal'eh =

Ruined castle in Iran

Coordinates: 36°15′18″N 50°00′11″E

- Near Qazvin in Iran
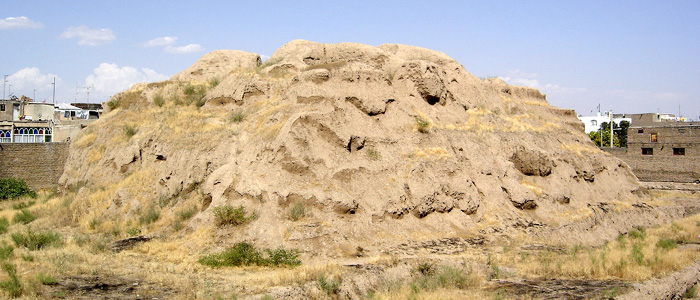

Site information
- Type: Castle

Location
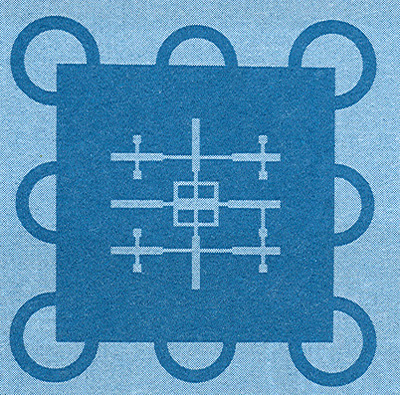
- plan of lower level
- Area: 5000 square meters

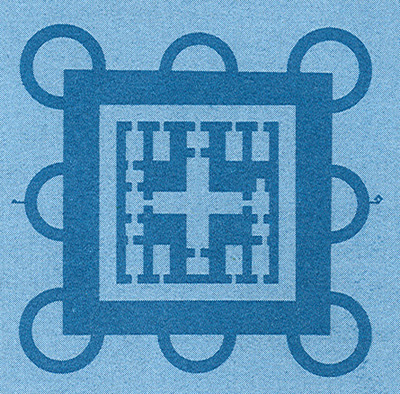
Meimoon Ghaleh, plan of main floor.

Meimoon Ghaleh, east–west section.

Meimoon Ghal'eh (Persian: میمون قلعه, literally 'Monkey Castle' or 'the Blessed Castle'), also known as Mehman Ghal'eh (مهمان قلعه) and Mobarak Ghal'eh (مبارک قلعه), is one of several castle ruins scattered throughout the Qazvin area, in Iran.

== Description ==
It sits in the south of the city of Qazvin, where has been always crowded, hence heavily eroded, and is almost 5000 square meters in footage. The remains indicate the castle to have had a large dome in its central section. All ceilings no longer exist. The fortification has a subterranean network of 3 east-west tunnels under the structure connected by a north–south tunnel. The two levels were connected via a helical staircase. The main gates must have been on the northern side, it is believed. Eight towers made of brick surrounded the castle. All evidence indicates this structure to have been a military fortress of some sorts.

== See also ==
- List of Iranian castles
- Iranian architecture
- History of Iran
