= Amini-ha Hosseiniyeh =

Hussainiya in Qazvin, Iran

Coordinates: 36°15′39″N 49°59′46″E

- حسینیه امینی‌ها
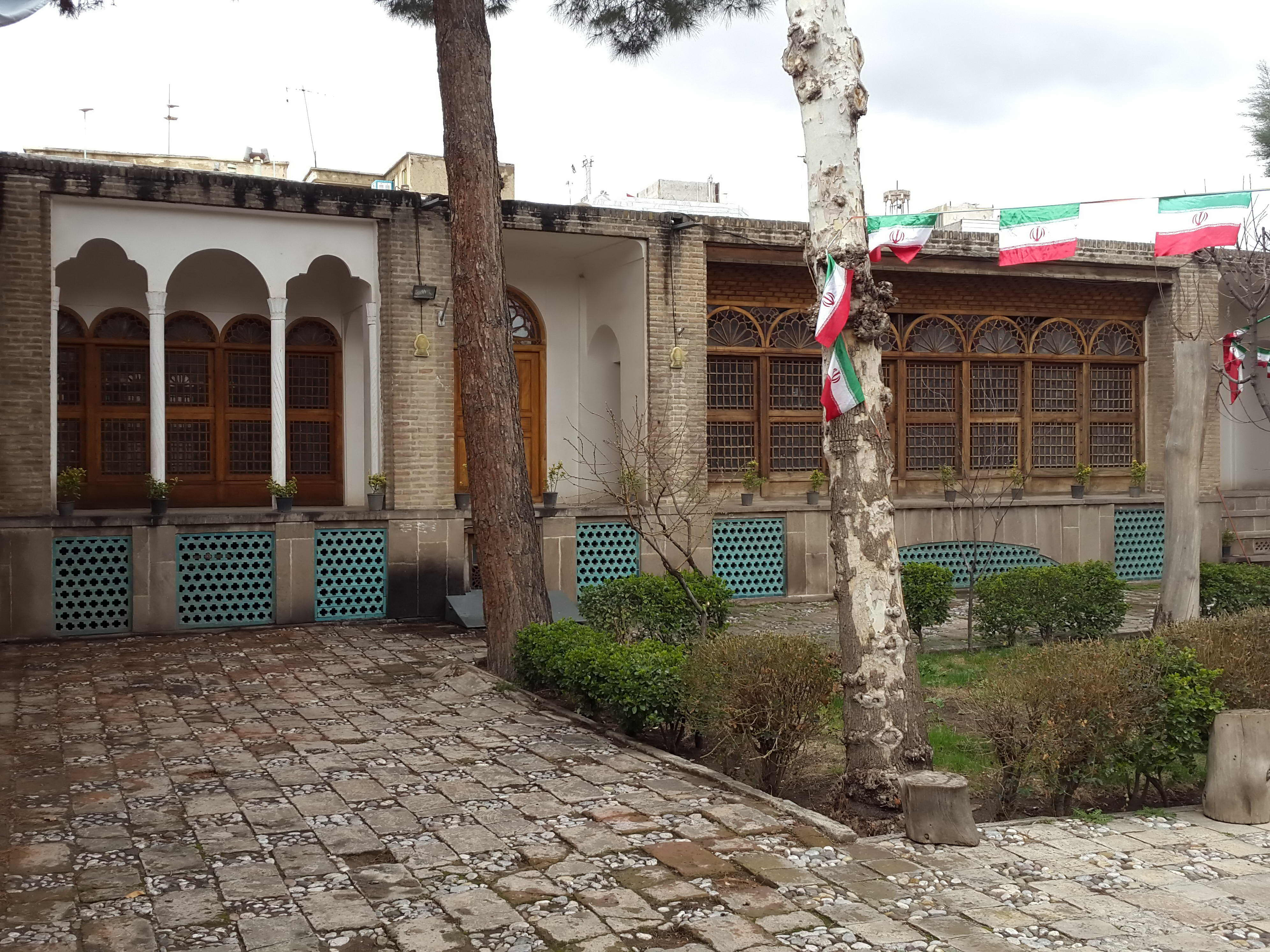
- Courtyard of the house

General information
- Architectural style: Qajar style

Iran National Heritage List
- Official name: Amini-ha Hosseinieh
- Type: Hosseinieh
- Designated: 1949
- Reference no.: 377
- Conservation organization: Cultural Heritage, Handicrafts and Tourism Organization of Iran
- Location: Qazvin, Iran
- Completed: 1858

Amini-ha Hosseiniyeh (Persian: حسینیه امینی‌ها) is a hosseiniyeh in the Akhund (Molavi) neighbourhood of Qazvin, Iran. Built in 1858, it comprises 16 interconnected structures.

The section under the halls comprises sectors such as the cellar, basement, store room, and kitchen which have access to the northern and southern courtyard. The north facing wall of the southern courtyard is of stone with innumerable embossments.

== Gallery ==
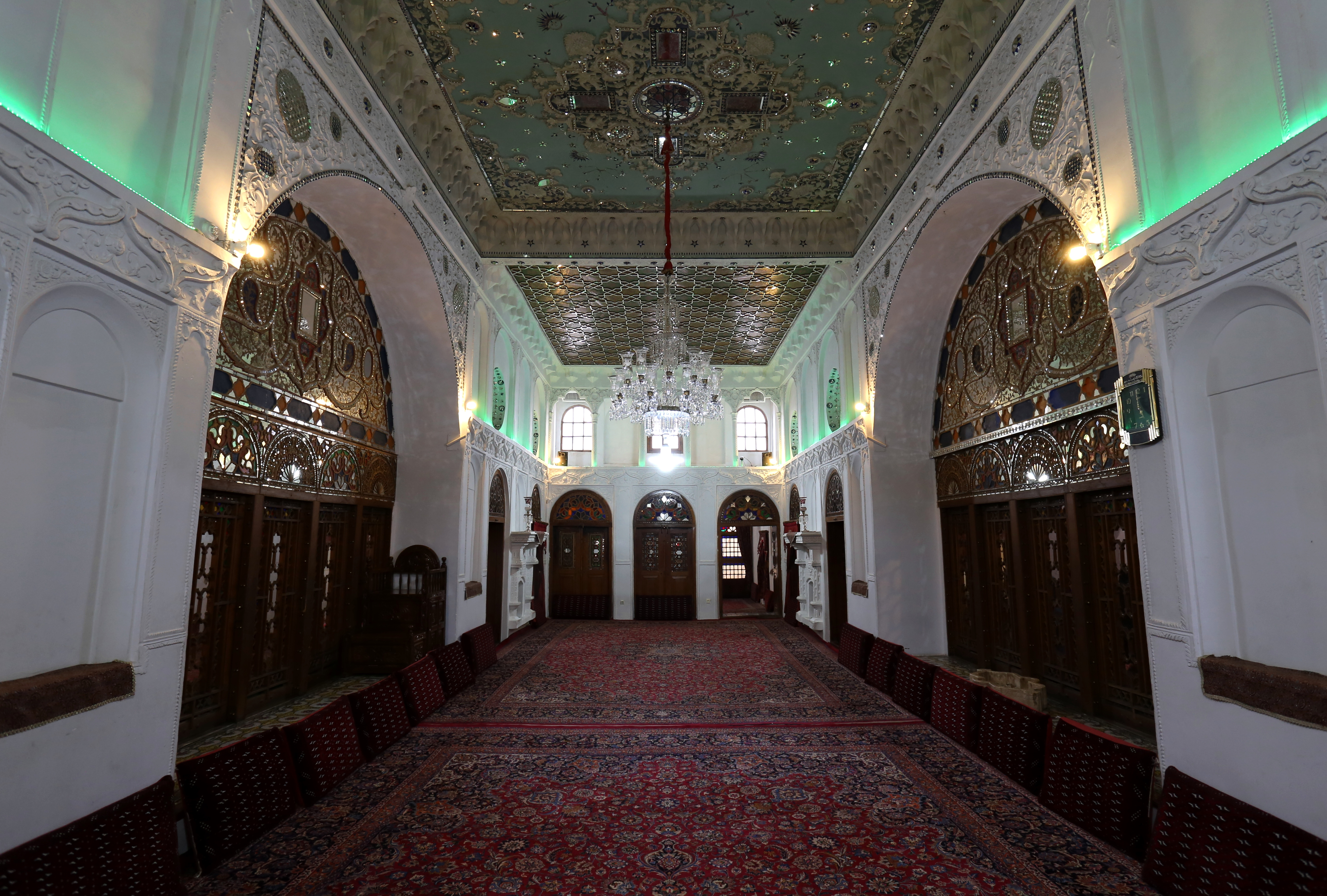

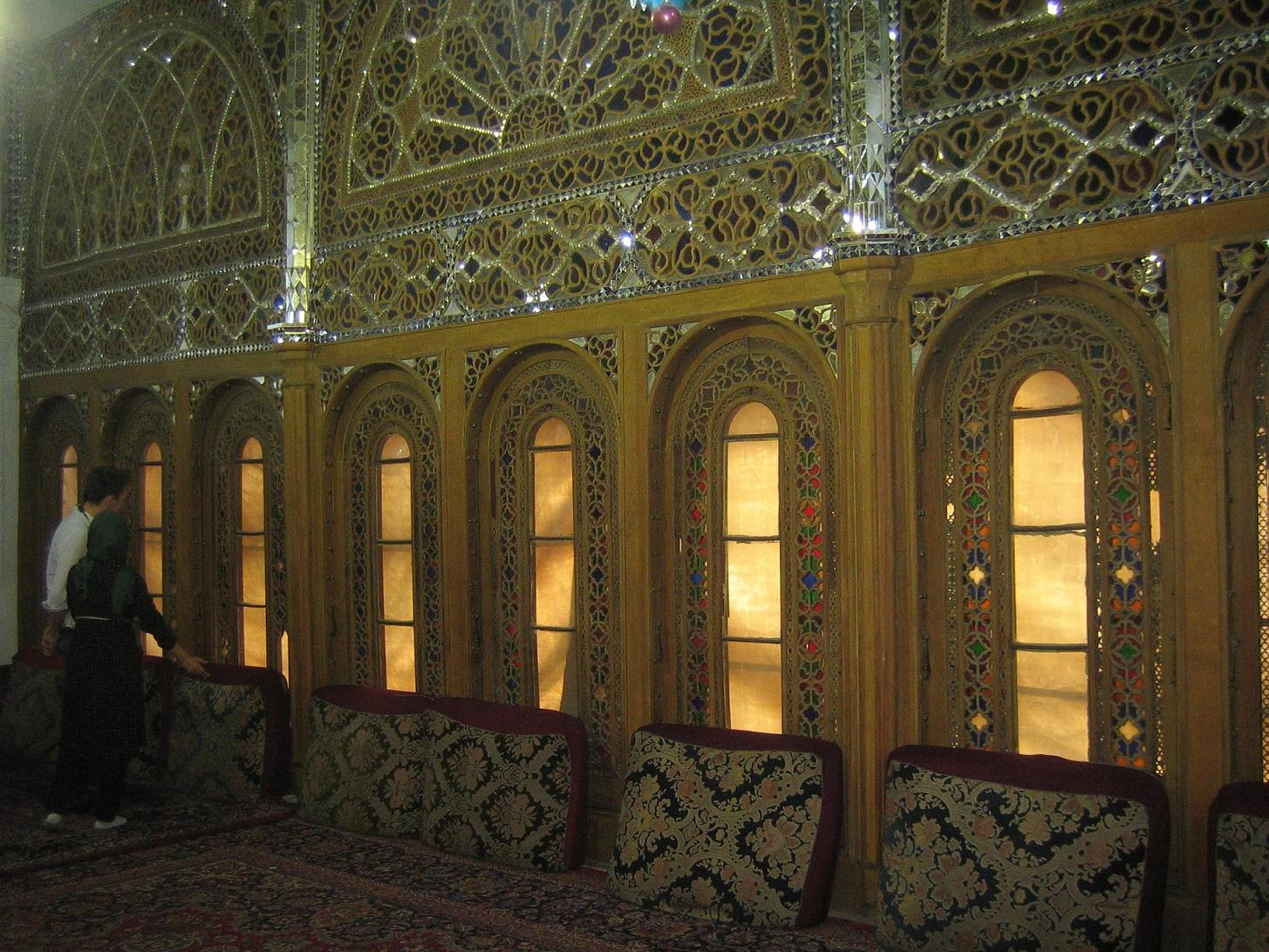
Orosi windows in Amini-ha Hosseiniyeh.

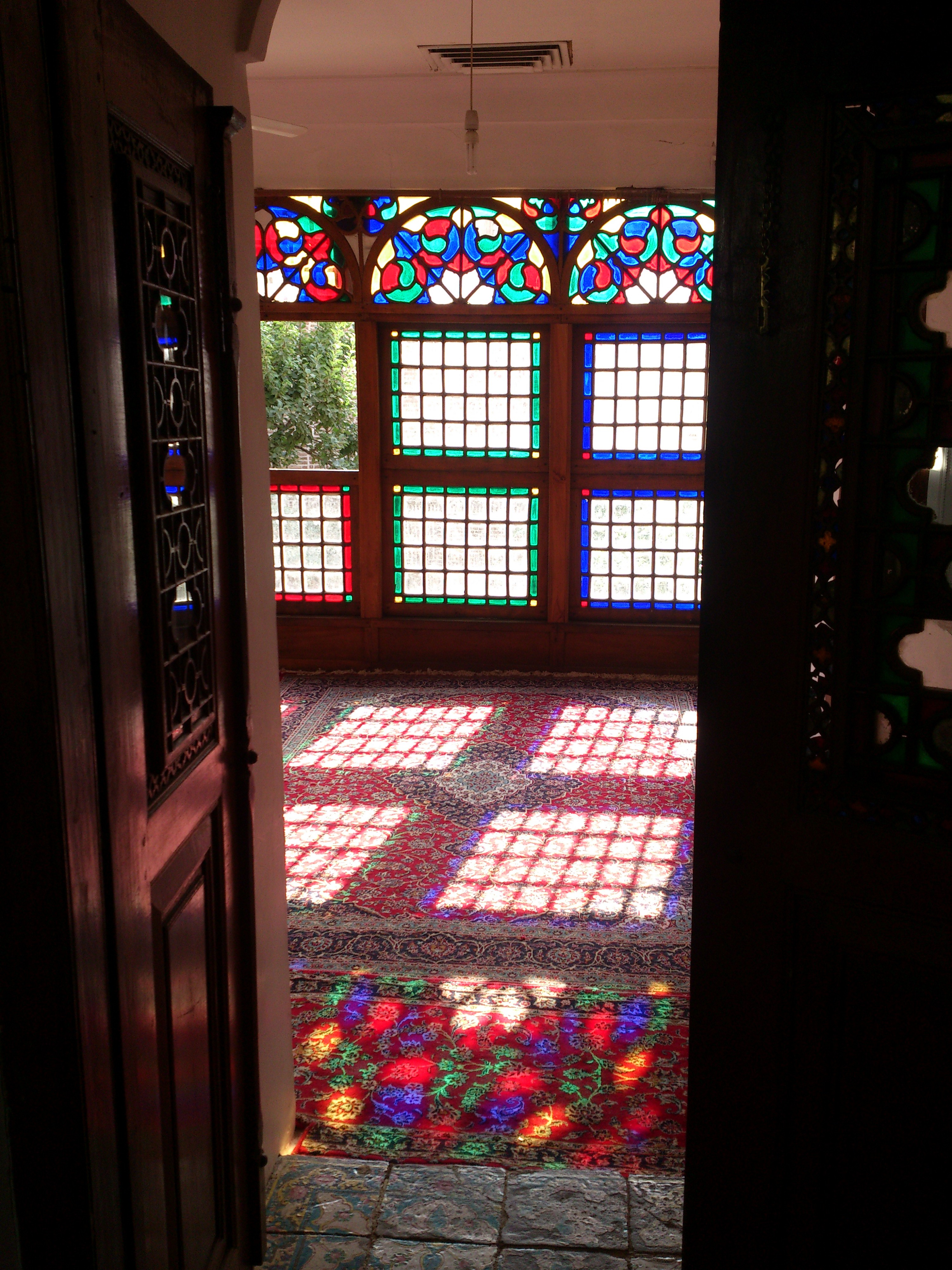

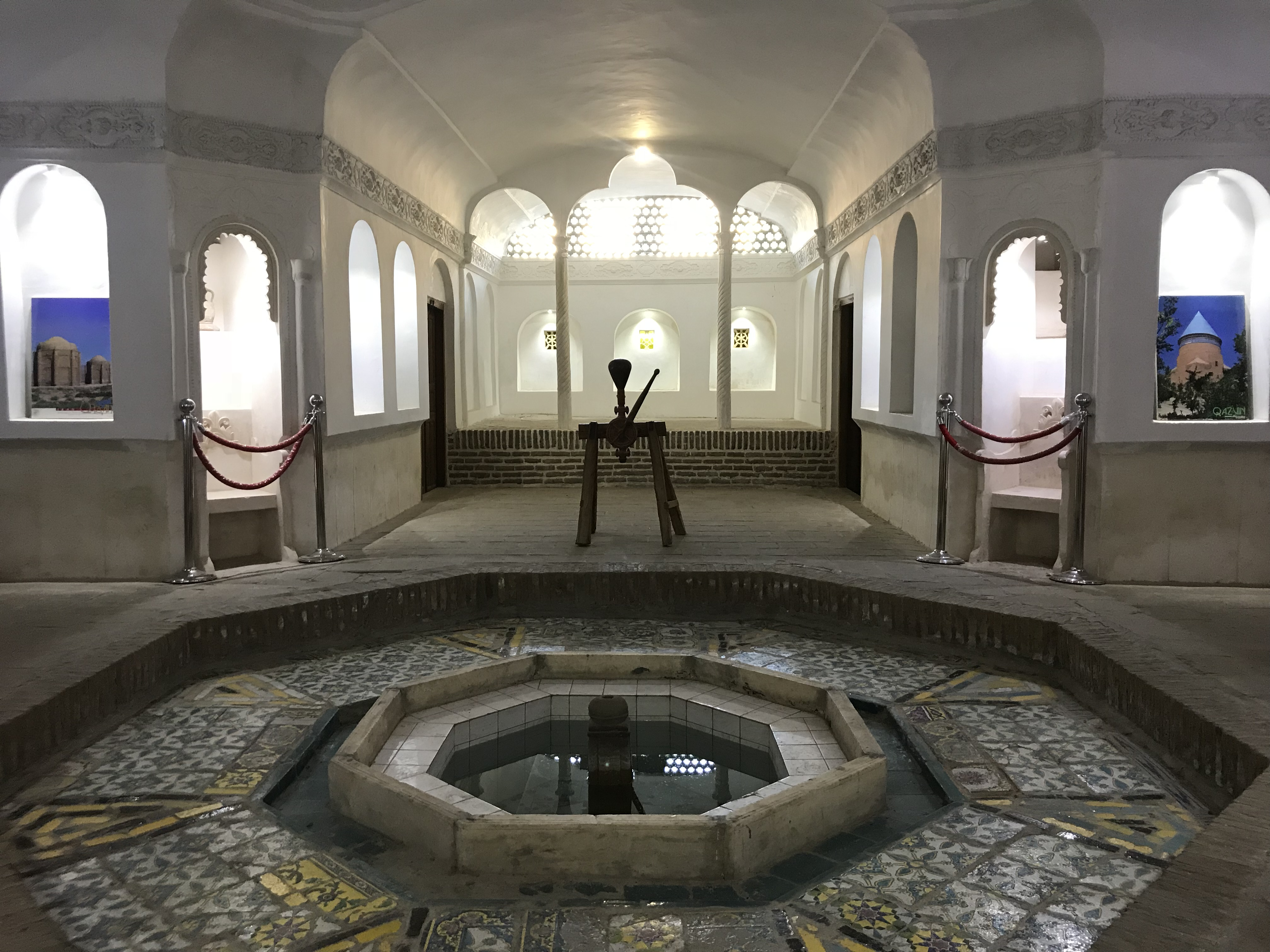

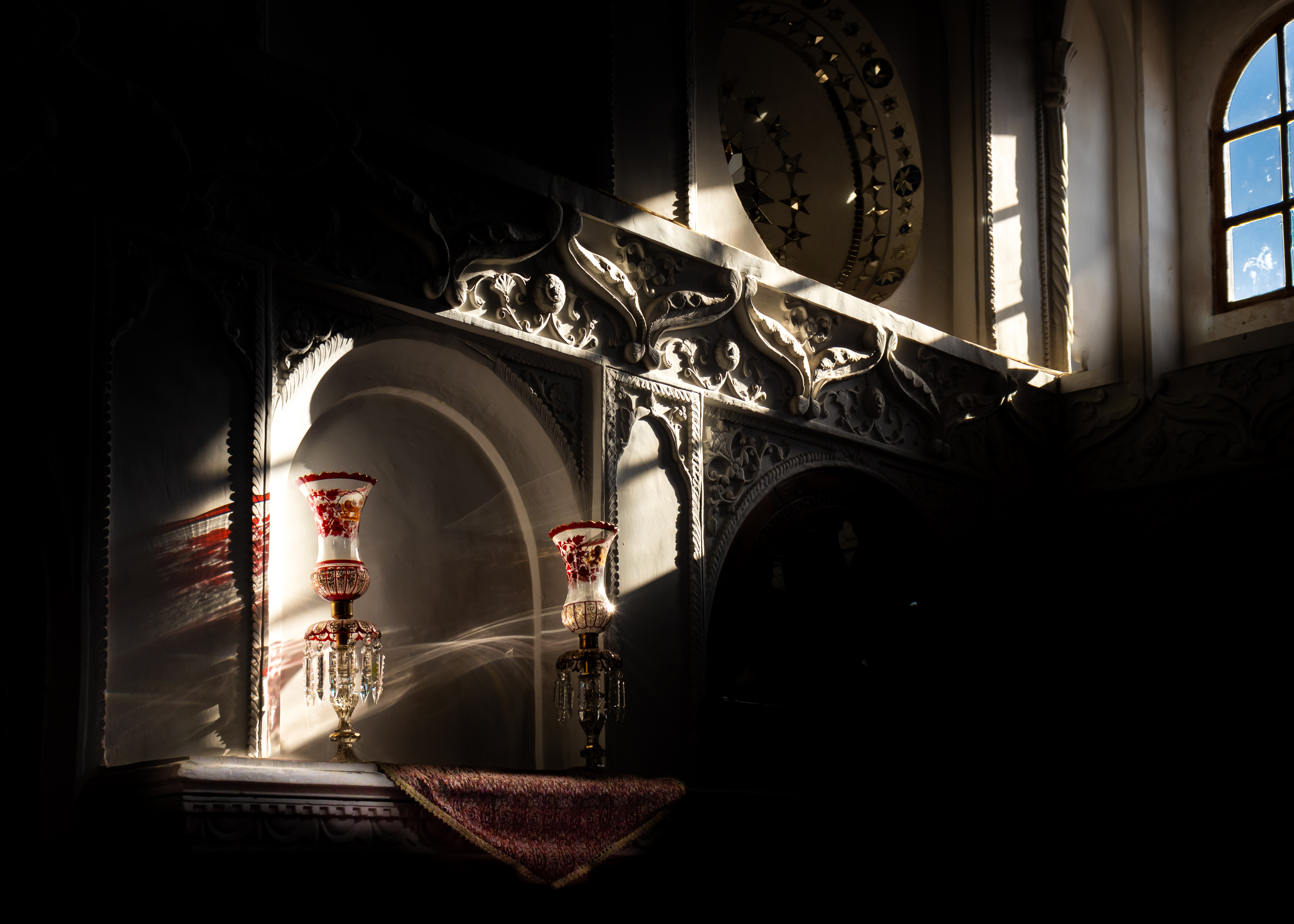
