= Heidarieh Mosque, Qazvin =

Former mosque, now school buildings, in Qazvin, Iran

Heidarieh Mosque
- مسجد حیدریه قزوین
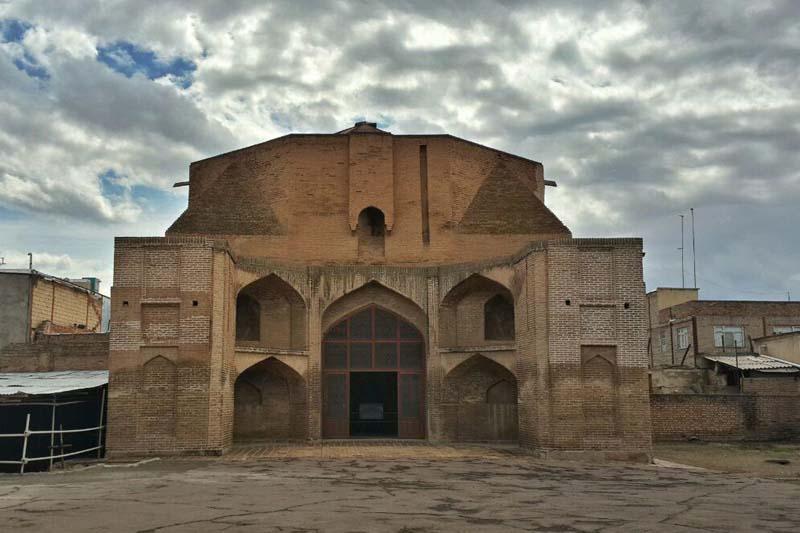
- The former mosque in 2007, part of an elementary school

- Location of the former mosque in Iran

Religion
- Affiliation: Shia Islam (former)
- Ecclesiastical or organisational status: Mosque; Madrasa; School library and auditorium
- Status: Inactive (as a mosque); Active (as an elementary school)

Location
- Location: Qazvin, Qazvin province
- Country: Iran
- Coordinates: 36°15′55″N 50°00′20″E

Architecture
- Type: Mosque architecture
- Style: Seljuk
- Established: 12th century; 19th century (incorp. into madrasa); 1955 (incorp. into school)

Specifications
- Dome: One (maybe more)
- Materials: Bricks; plaster

Iran National Heritage List
- Official name: Heydarieh Mosque
- Type: Mosque
- Designated: 1933
- Reference no.: 200
- Conservation organization: Cultural Heritage, Handicrafts and Tourism Organization of Iran

The Heydarieh Mosque (Persian: مسجد حیدریه قزوین, romanized: Masjid-i Haydariyya) (Note: Also variously known as the Heidarieh Mosque, the Heydariyeh Madrasa, and the Heidarieh Madrasa.) is a former Shi'ite mosque, now elementary school buildings since 1955, located in the city of Qazvin, in the province of Qazvin, Iran.

The former mosque was added to the Iran National Heritage List on 31 July 1933, administered by the Cultural Heritage, Handicrafts and Tourism Organization of Iran.

The building was initially a Zoroastrian fire temple, erected in the Iranian pre-Islam era. Renovated after an earthquake in 1119 CE, the building today sits in the yard of an elementary school, and functions as the school's library and auditorium.

== Overview ==
The Haydariyya Mosque in the Bolaghi district of Qazvin is a monument from the Seljuk period, presumably from the late 12th or early 13th century. Under the Qajar dynasty in the 19th century, the mosque was incorporated into the structure of a madrasa. However, most parts of the madrasa were later demolished to make way for the construction of an elementary school in 1955. The stylistic features of the Haydariyya Mosque resemble those of the Friday Mosque of Qazvin, and it is therefore assumed that the Haydariyya Mosque was built or renovated by the same architect.

The mosque consists of a single domed chamber prayer hall. This mosque was located on the south side of a courtyard, which was surrounded by the madrasa's arched cells on its east, west and north sides. The entrances to the complex were located on the northeast and northwest of the courtyard, and there were once nine cells on the east and west sides next to the entrances. The north side of the madrasa consisted of a central iwan flanked by three cells on each side.

The square plan of the Seljuk prayer hall is 14 square metres (150 sq ft) on the outside and 10 square metres (110 sq ft) on the mosque's interior. The mosque is entered from the north, where an entrance iwan, measuring 6 by 14 metres (20 by 46 ft), was later added to the Seljuk structure. The domed chamber of this mosque is structured similarly to Sasanid chahar taq fire temples, within which the square plan is transformed into an octagon via squinches that support a brick dome. However, the dome of this mosque is no longer extant. A more recent temporary roof now protects the interior space.

The mosque is constructed of brick and is famous for its splendid brickwork facing and carved stucco decorations. Additionally, its decoration is remarkable for its early glazed tiles. Arched niches in interior corners are topped with carved stucco inscriptions and muqarnas brick decorations. The rhombus brick patterns on the squinches are decorated with inscribed bas-relief circles. There is also a fine floriated Kufic plaster inscription frieze below the dome arches. Some of the inscriptions are from the Surah Hashr in the Quran.

The mihrab on the south wall of the prayer hall is composed of finely carved stucco on a painted blue background. Although the bottom half of the mihrab has been damaged, it remains one of the finest examples of Iranian stucco mihrabs. Stylized high relief pomegranates and pine cones are found on the frame around the mihrab and on the arch of the dome above the mihrab.

== Gallery ==
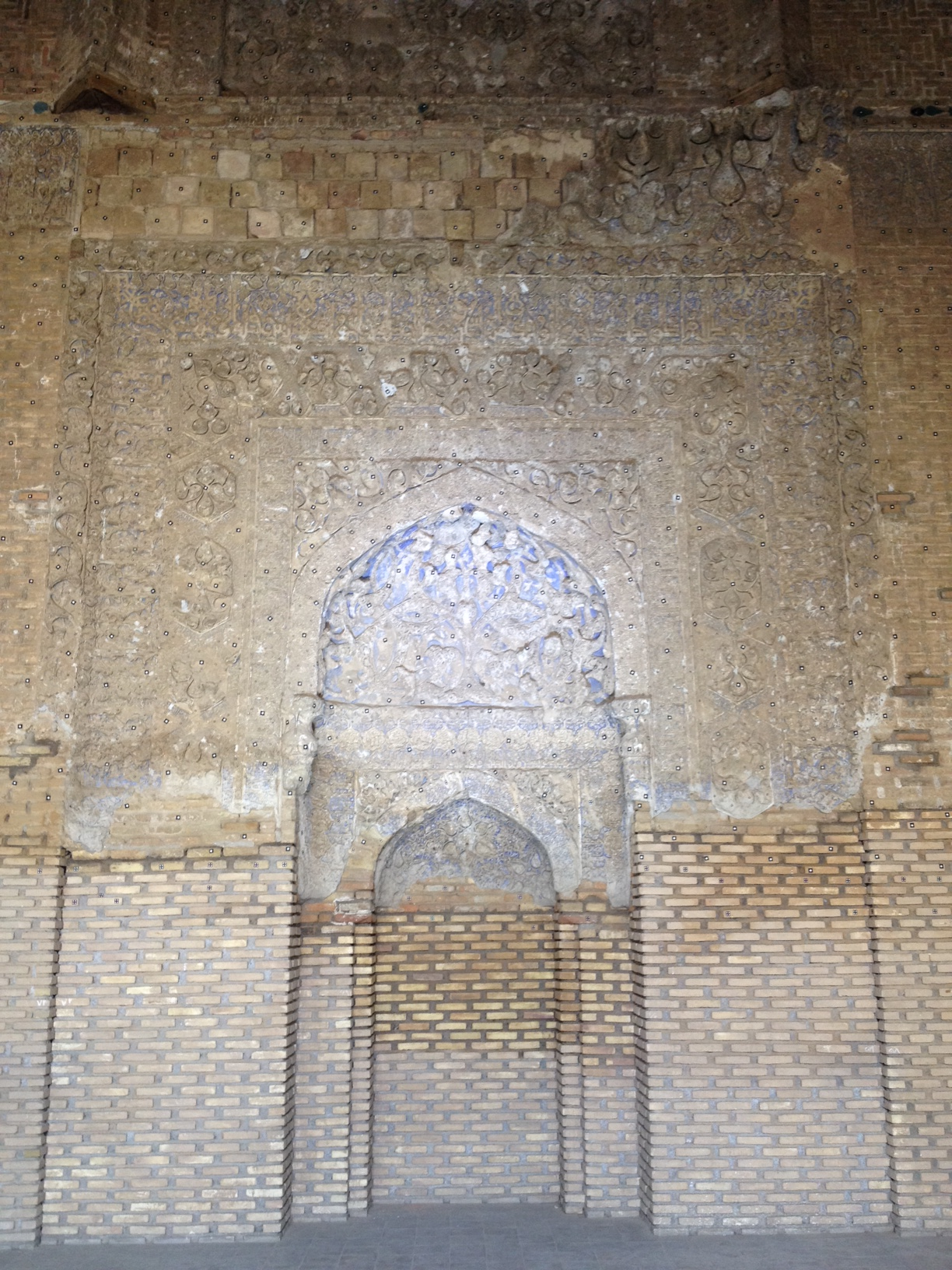

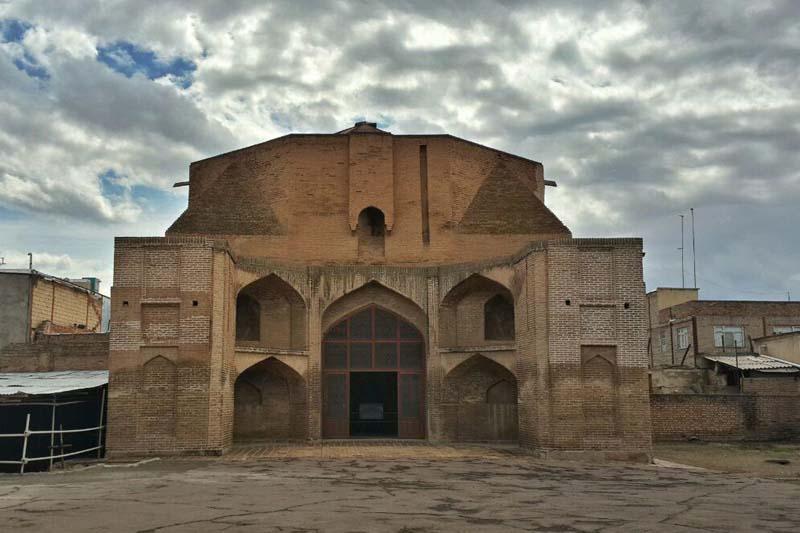

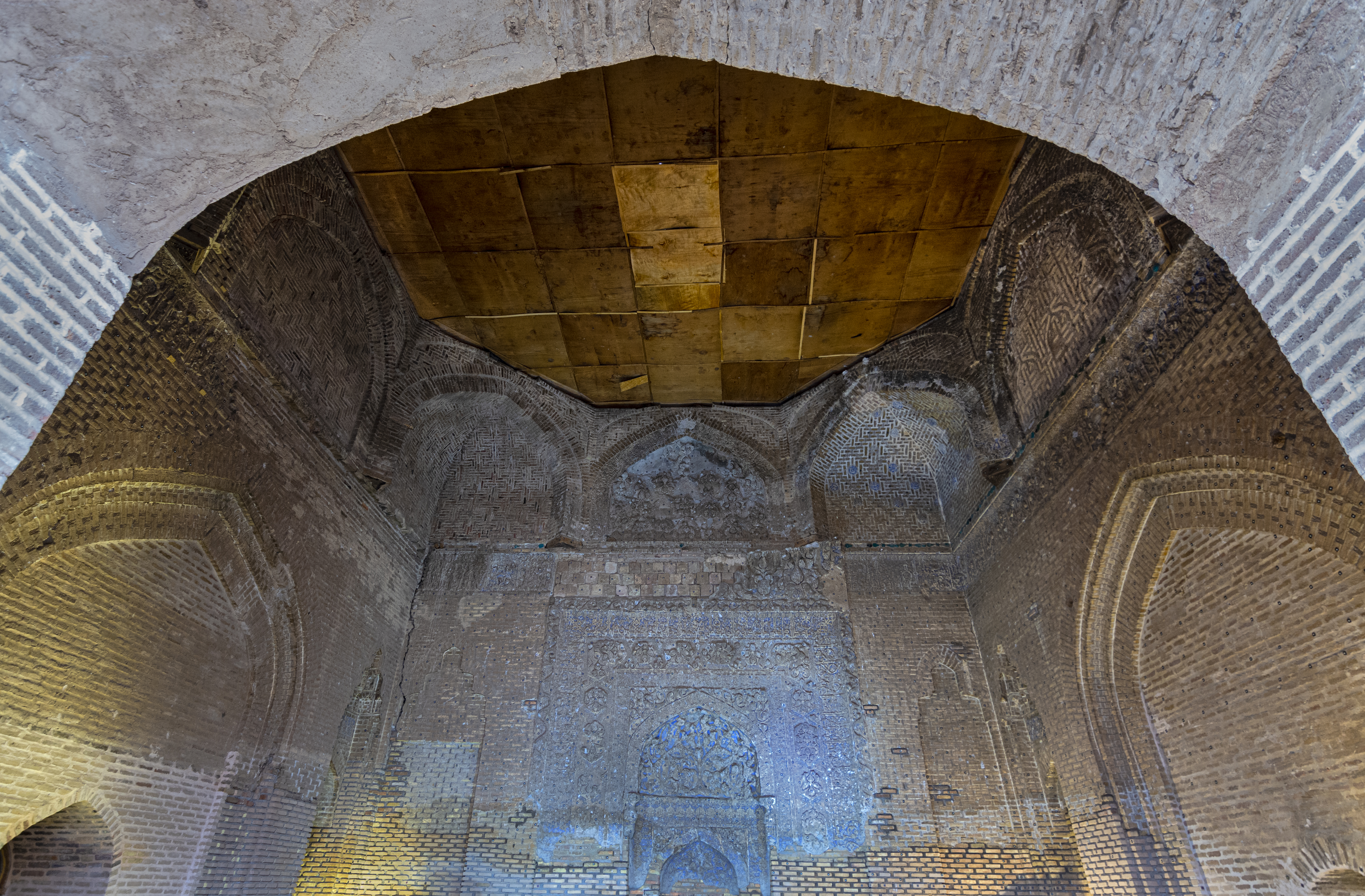

== See also ==
- Shia Islam in Iran
- List of mosques in Iran
- List of schools in Iran
