= Techmash Qazvin BC =

Techmash Qazvin
- Leagues: Iranian Super League
- Arena: Shahid Babaie Hall, Qazvin
- Location: Qazvin, Iran
- Team colors: White
- Vice-president(s): Mehdi Norouzi
- Head coach: (Iran) Abolghasem Kiani
- Website: Official website
Home

Techmash Qazvin Basketball Club is an Iranian professional basketball club based in Qazvin, Iran. They entered the Iranian Basketball Super League.

The team was owned and sponsored by Techmash Industrial Group. After qualification in Super League, the team transferred to another company, Foolad Haft Almas.
