= Mullá Hádí-i-Qazvini =

Figure in the Bábí movement

Mullá Hádí (Arabic: ملا هادي) was the fifteenth Letter of the Living in the Bábí movement and also the son of Mullá Abdu'l-Vahhab-i-Qazvíni who was a close companion of Shaykh Ahmad with whom he shared the message of fast approaching Revelation. Mullá Hádí was initially a Shaykhi a student of Siyyid Kázim. He did not get involved in the Battle of fort Shaykh Tabarsi and shielded his life through the practice of Taqiyya. He was also the brother of another letter of the living Mullá Muhammad-'Aliy-i-Qazvini.

After the death of the Báb, the Bábís split into a number of factions one of which was led by Mullá Hádí. He later became a devout Azalí and was expelled from the community by Baháʼu'lláh during the Edirne period "and spent his final days in oblivion".

Mullá Hádí is a controversial Letter of the Living since it is not entirely clear that he was actually one. He is noted as absent in the list formed by Amanat [1987] and replaced by Mullá Muhammad-i-Mayáma'í. This is explained in a footnote that although he is included in Nabil's list provided in The Dawn-breakers, the incomplete list provided by al-Karbalá'í al-Qatíl has Mullá Muhammad-i-Mayáma'í in his place. Qatíl described Mullá Hádí as "in darkness" in spite of his brother's vigour and the fact that in later years he never showed any serious interest in the movement. Mullá Muhammad-i-Mayáma'í's preaching in his home town of Mayámay gave him weight in Amanat's eyes.
