= Shahrak-e Danesh, Qazvin =

Neighborhood in Qazvin province, Iran

Shahrak-e Danesh Persian: شهرك دانش
- Neighborhood
- Country: Iran
- Province: Qazvin
- County: Qazvin
- District: Central
- City: Qazvin

Population (2011)
  - Total: 377
- Time zone: UTC+3:30 (IRST)

Shahrak-e Danesh (Persian: شهرك دانش) (Note: Also romanized as Shahraḵ-e Dānesh) is a neighborhood in the city of Qazvin in the Central District of Qazvin County, Qazvin province, Iran.

== Demographics ==
=== Population ===
At the time of the 2006 National Census, Shahrak-e Danesh's population was 39 in 10 households, when it was a village in Eqbal-e Gharbi Rural District. The following census in 2011 counted 377 people in 119 households. The village was annexed to the city of Qazvin in 2015.
