= Shah-Mohammad Qazvini =

Shah-Mohammad ibn Mobarak Qazvini (Ottoman Turkish: Şah Mehmed ibn Mübarek-i Kazvinî), best simply known as Shah-Mohammad Qazvini (died 1557), was a 16th-century palace physician and man of letters in the Ottoman Empire. He wrote in Persian and flourished during the reigns of Selim I and Suleiman the Magnificent.

== Biography ==
Qazvini, a Persian émigré, emigrated to the Ottoman Empire on the recommendation of his old schoolmate Müʾeyyedzade after a stop in Mecca where he studied. Through Müʾeyyedzade's advice, Ottoman Sultan Bayezid II offered Qazvini a salary of 120 silver aspers per day for his skills and talents as a doctor (hakim, spelled as hekim in Turkish) and man of letters. Finding himself at the Ottoman court, Qazvini's reputation as a refined and cultivated belle-lettrist continued to spread and strengthen. During the reign of Bayezid's son and successor Selim I, Qazvini was repeatedly present at the foremost social and learned gatherings of the royal court and of wider Ottoman society. During his stay in Ottoman lands, he became known as a man with a refined cultural taste. According to the estimations of Aşık Çelebi, a contemporaneous author and poet, he was foremost amongst Sultan Selim's intimate friends in addition to being the chief physician. Qazvini introduced more Persian literary figures to the Ottoman court, including Ada'i, who, in his verse history of Selim's reign, recognizes the Persians Qazvini and Shams al-Din Bada'i for being able to secure an introduction to the office of chief military judge of the sultanate.

Overall, Qazvini put effort into augmenting the reputation of Persian émigrées in the Ottoman Empire through his Persian translation and continuation of the Majalis-i nafaʾis ("Assemblies of Precious Things"), originally written by the late Timurid-period statesmen and writer Ali-Shir Nava'i. Qazvini's addition to Nava'i's work is geared towards the preservation of adept Persian-language poets of the Ottoman Empire and Iran who were contemporaneous to Selim's tenure. However, his contribution is clearly aimed at an Ottoman readership, since a considerable amount of the entries describe poets who immgirated or passed through the Ottoman realm, many of whom are not attested in other works. Qazvini died in 1557.
