= Qaleh Kurd =

Oldest archaeological site in Iran

- غار قلعه‌کُرد (Persian)
- Location within Iran
- 35.7972°N 48.8572°E
- Location: Qazvin province, Iran

Site notes
- Elevation: 2,137 m (7,011 ft)

Qaleh Kurd cave (Persian: غار قلعه‌کُرد) is the oldest archaeological site discovered in Iran. The cave is located at the very western limit of the Iranian Central Plateau, not far from the village of Qaleh in Qazvin province, surrounded by the Alborz and Zagros Mountains.

== Name ==
The name in Persian language means the castle of Kurd and has been transcribed to English as Qaleh Kurd, Ghaleh Kord and Ghaleh Kurd.

== Archeological importance ==
Researchers found ancient human remains in the Cave of Qaleh Kurd estimated to be between 600,000 and 700,000 years old.

Qaleh Kurd Cave is the oldest prehistoric site in Iran where traces of human activities dating back to the Middle Pleistocene have been discovered. Indeed, the results of analyzes concerning different archaeological assemblages in the cave are dated between -452.000 and -165.000 years ago.

These discoveries make this site, from a regional and chronological point of view, a key site for the knowledge of the first human settlements and their dispersion between the Levant and Asia.

The cave is known for its archeological importance especially for the discovery in situ of Chibanian archaeological assemblages. There have been multiple excavations in the Qaleh Kurd cave performed by different teams. During these excavations numerous artifacts have been discovered that include human remains, animal bones and neolithic artifacts.

== See also ==
- Bisitun Cave
- Darband Cave
- Do-Ashkaft Cave
- Kashafrud
- Hotu and Kamarband Caves
- Qal'eh Bozi
- Warwasi
