= Grand =

Grand may refer to:

== People with the name ==
- Grand (surname)
- Grand L. Bush (born 1955), American actor

== Places ==
- Grand, Oklahoma, US
- Grand, Vosges, village and commune in France with Gallo-Roman amphitheatre
- Grand County (disambiguation), several places
- Grand Geyser, Upper Geyser Basin of Yellowstone, US
- Le Grand, California, US; unincorporated community
- Mount Grand, Brockville, New Zealand

== Arts, entertainment, and media ==
- Grand (Erin McKeown album), 2003
- Grand (Matt and Kim album), 2009
- "Grand", a 1997 single by Derek Bailey and Tony Oxley, from the album Soho Suites
- "Grand", a 2001 single by Blue Foundation, from the album Blue Foundation
- "Grand", a 2006 single by Matt & Kim, from the album Matt & Kim
- "Grand", a 2016 single by Mac Miller, from the album The Divine Feminine
- "Grand", a 2022 single by Kane Brown, from the album Different Man
- Grand (magazine), a lifestyle magazine related to related to grandparents
- Grand (TV series), American sitcom, 1990
- Grand Production, Serbian record label company

== Other uses ==
- Great Recycling and Northern Development Canal, also known as GRAND Canal
- Grand (slang), one thousand units of currency
- Giant Radio Array for Neutrino Detection, also known as GRAND

== See also ==
- Grand Hotel (disambiguation)
- Grand River (disambiguation)
- Grand station (disambiguation)
- Grand Street (disambiguation)
- Grand Theatre (disambiguation)
- Grande (disambiguation)
- Le Grand (disambiguation)
- The Grand (disambiguation)
- Great (disambiguation)
