= Grand Hotel =

A grand hotel is a large and luxurious hotel, especially one housed in a building with traditional architectural style. It began to flourish in the 1800s in Europe and North America.

Grand Hotel may refer to:

== Hotels ==
=== Africa ===
- Grande Hotel Beira, a former luxury hotel in Beira, Mozambique

=== Asia ===
- Grand Hotel d'Angkor, Siem Reap, Cambodia
- Grand Hôtel de Pékin, one block of the Beijing Hotel, Beijing, China
- Grand Hotel (Kolkata), Kolkata, India
- Dariush Grand Hotel, Kish Island, Iran
- Grand Hotel, Qazvin, Iran
- Sapporo Grand Hotel, Sapporo, Japan
- Grand Hotel Kathmandu, Kathmandu, Nepal
- Grand Hotel (Nuwara Eliya), Sri Lanka
- Grand Hotel (Taipei), Taiwan
- Kaohsiung Grand Hotel, Kaohsiung, Taiwan
- Grand Métropole Hôtel, the original name of the Sofitel Legend Metropole Hanoi, Vietnam

=== Australasia ===
- Grand Hotel, Childers, Queensland, Australia
- Grand Hotel, Mount Morgan, Queensland, Australia
- Grand Hotel (Auckland), New Zealand
- Hotel Windsor, Melbourne, Victoria, Australia; originally known as The Grand Hotel

=== Europe ===
- Grand Hotel Wien, Vienna, Austria
- Grand Hotel Sofia, Bulgaria
- Grandhotel Pupp, Karlovy Vary, Czech Republic
- Grand Hotel, Birmingham, England
- Grand Brighton Hotel, England
- Grand Hotel, Eastbourne, England
- Grand Hotel (Leicester), England
- Grand Hotel (Scarborough), England
- Grand Hotel (Torquay), England
- Grand Hotel and Spa (York), England
- Grand Hotel Kämp, Helsinki, Finland
- InterContinental Paris Le Grand Hotel, Paris, France
- Grand Hotel Esplanade, Berlin, Germany
- Grand Hotel Villa d'Este, Cernobbio, Italy
- The Grand Hotel Rimini, Italy
- Grand Hotel des Bains, Venice, Italy
- Grand Hotel Prishtina, Kosovo
- Grand Hotel (Valletta), Malta
- Grand Hotel (Oslo), Norway
- Grand Hotel, Łódź, Poland
- Grand Hotel (Sopot), Poland
- Grand Hotel Traian (Iași), Romania
- Grand Hotel (Rostov-on-Don), Russia
- Grand Hotel Europe, St. Petersburg, Russia
- Hamilton Grand, St Andrews, Scotland
- Grand Hotel Kempinski High Tatras, High Tatras, Slovakia
- Grand Hotel Union, Ljubljana, Slovenia
- Grand Hotel (Lund), Sweden
- Grand Hotel (Jönköping), Sweden
- Grand Hôtel (Stockholm), Sweden
- Grand Hotel Saltsjöbaden, Sweden
- Grand Hotel (Locarno), Switzerland
- Grand Hotel Dolder, Zurich, Switzerland
- Grand Hotel Kronenhof, Pontresina, Switzerland
- Grand Hotel (Lviv), Ukraine
- Grand Hotel (Llandudno), Wales
- Poseidonion Grand Hotel (Spetses), Greece

=== North America ===
- Canada's grand railway hotels
- The Grand Doubletree, condominium and hotel skyscraper in Miami, Florida
- Grand Hotel (Mackinac Island), Michigan, listed on the National Register of Historic Places
- Historic Grand Hotels on the Mississippi Gulf Coast, in several Mississippi locations
- Grand Hotel (Highmount, New York)
- Grand Hotel (New York City)

=== South America ===
- Grand Hotel, Buenos Aires, Argentina

== Entertainment and the arts ==
- Grand Hotel (1927 film), a German silent film
- Grand Hotel (novel), a 1929 book by Vicki Baum
  - Grand Hotel (play), a 1931 play by Edward Knoblock based on the novel
  - Grand Hotel (1932 film), a 1932 American film based on Baum's 1929 novel and William A. Drake's 1930 play
    - Grand Hotel (musical), a 1989 Broadway musical based on the 1932 film
- Grand Hotel, long-running BBC light music radio programme (1943-1973)
- Grandhotel, a 2006 Czech film
- Gran Hotel (TV series), a 2011 Spanish drama television series
  - Grand Hotel (TV series), a 2019 American drama series based on the Spanish series
- Grand Hotel Europa, a 2018 novel by Dutch author Ilja Leonard Pfeijffer

=== Music ===
- Grand Hotel (album), a 1973 album by Procol Harum
- Grand Hotel (musical), a 1989 Broadway musical based on the 1932 film
- Grand Hotel (Roadstar album), a 2006 album by Roadstar
- Grand Hotel, initial name of the British band the Quick

== Other uses ==
- Grand Hotel Railroad Station, Highmount, New York
- FC Grand Hotel Varna, a football club based in Varna, Bulgaria

== See also ==
- Grand Brighton Hotel, England
- The Grand Budapest Hotel, a 2014 film starring Ralph Fiennes
- Grand Pacific Hotel (disambiguation)
- Grand Union Hotel (disambiguation)
- The Grand (disambiguation)
- Hilbert's paradox of the Grand Hotel, a mathematical paradox related to set theory and countable infinities
