= Grand (surname) =

Grand is a surname. Notable people with the name include:

- Catherine Grand (1761–1835), French salon-holder
- Cédric Grand (born 1976), Swiss bobsledder
- Gil Grand (born 1968), Canadian country music singer
- Jean-Philippe Grand (born 1953), French racing driver
- Jean-Pierre Grand (born 1950), French politician
- Jens Grand (1260–1327), Danish archbishop
- Joe Grand (born 1975), American electrical engineer
- Katie Grand (born 1971), British stylist and fashion journalist
- Laëtitia Grand (born 1990), French rugby union player
- Murray Grand (1919–2007), American musician
- Otis Grand (1950–2023), American blues musician
- Pascale Grand (born 1967), Canadian racewalker
- Roger Grand (1874–1962), French historian, archivist and politician
- Sarah Grand (1854–1943), British feminist writer
- Simon Grand (born 1984), English footballer
- Steve Grand (born 1990), American singer-songwriter
- Steve Grand (roboticist) (born 1958), English computer scientist

== See also ==
- Le Grand (disambiguation)
- Grand (disambiguation)
