= Giracula =

2019 children's book by Caroline Watkins

Giracula is a 2019 children's book by Caroline Watkins, with illustrations by Mark Tuchman, about a vampiric giraffe. It was first published by Persnickety Press.

== Synopsis ==
When a giraffe is attacked by a vampire bat, he awakens with vampiric powers and an overwhelming hunger for pastry.

== Reception ==
Critical reception of Giracula has been mixed. Publishers Weekly praised the "googly-eyed energy" of Tuchman's art, and called Giracula's fangs "adorably petite", but faulted the quality of Watkins' rhyming, and considered the ending "abrupt". Kirkus Reviews similarly found the rhyming to be "rough", with scansion that "occasionally falters", and observed that no explanation is provided for Giracula's preference for pastry rather than blood, while positing that the quality of Tuchman's art would not be "enough to draw readers back again".

School Library Journal commended Tuchman's portrayal of the "lovable cartoon creature" who "has an appealing look", but considered that his depictions of humans was "less inspired", with "scattershot" composition and "objects and environments [that] often look different from one page to the next, leaving [Giracula] without a sense of place". Grand felt that the "rhymes seem a bit forced", but overall concluded that the book would be "fun" for children, particularly if they had "a weakness for sugary delights".
