= Legrand =

Legrand may refer to:

- Legrand (surname)
- LeGrand (band)
- Legrand (company), a French producer of hardware for electrical installations
- Legrand, California, former name of Le Grand, California
- Former name of the Ben Freha municipality in the Oran wilaya in Algeria
- Legrand, Michigan, an unincorporated community

== See also ==
- Le Grand (disambiguation)
- Lagrand, a former commune, Hautes-Alpes, France
- Lagrande, a computer hardware technology
- Justice LeGrand (disambiguation)
