= Grand Theatre =

Grand Theatre, Grand Theater, Grand Théâtre (French), may refer to:

== Theatres and cinemas ==
=== Australia ===
- Grand Theatre, Adelaide, a former cinema
- Grand Theatre, Perth, a former cinema and theatre

=== China ===
- Chang'an Grand Theatre, Beijing
- National Centre for the Performing Arts (China), formerly National Grand Theater, Beijing
- Shanghai Grand Theatre
- Grand Theatre (Shanghai)

=== Canada ===
- The Grand Theatre (Kingston, Ontario)
- The Grand Theatre (London, Ontario)
- Grand Théâtre de Québec

=== Japan ===
- Konpira Grand Theatre, Kotohira, Kagawa
- Takarazuka Grand Theater, Takarazuka, Hyogo

=== Poland ===
- Grand Theatre, Łódź
- Grand Theatre, Lwów, former name when in Poland - now Lviv Theatre of Opera and Ballet, Lviv, Ukraine
- Grand Theatre, Warsaw

=== Ukraine ===
- Lviv Theatre of Opera and Ballet
- Odesa Opera and Ballet Theatre

=== United Kingdom ===
- Grand Theatre, Blackpool
- Grand Theatre, Clapham
- Grand Theatre, Derby, operated between 1886 and 1950
- Grand Theatre, Doncaster, operated between 1899 and 1963
- Grand Theatre, Leeds
- Grand Theatre, Lancaster
- Grand Theatre, Swansea
- Grand Theatre, Wolverhampton

=== United States ===
- The Grand Theatre, a chain of 14 multiplex cinemas in the southern United States operated by Southern Theatres
- Grand Theatre (Douglas, Arizona), a.k.a. Douglas Grand Theatre, listed on the National Register of Historic Places (NRHP)
- Warner Grand Theatre, San Pedro, California
- Masonic Hall and Grand Theater, Wilmington, Delaware, listed on the NRHP
- Grand Theatre (Cartersville, Georgia), designed by Daniell & Beutell
- Loew's Grand Theatre, Atlanta, Georgia
- Grand Theatre (Wheaton, Illinois), a historic theater
- Brown Grand Theatre, Concordia, Kansas
- Grand Theatre (Thibodaux, Louisiana)
- Grand Theater in Crookston, Minnesota, the oldest continuously operating movie theater in the United States
- Grand Theatre (Manhattan), demolished theater on Grand Street, Manhattan, New York City
- Grand Theater in Bismarck, North Dakota, screens are covered by curtains which open for the previews and feature.
- Grand Theater (Salem, Oregon)
- Grand Theater (Wausau, Wisconsin), built on the site of the former Grand Opera House
- Grand Theatre, another name of the Grand Opera House (St. Louis)
- Grand Theatre (Reno), inside the Grand Sierra Resort

=== Elsewhere ===
Sorted by country

- Grand Theatre (Copenhagen), Denmark
- Grand Théâtre de Bordeaux, France
- Grand Senen Theater, Jakarta, Indonesia
- Grand Theatre, Lebanon, located in Beirut
- Grand Théâtre de Genève, Geneva, Switzerland

== Other uses ==
- The Grand Theatre, Volume One, an album by alt-country band Old 97's
- The Grand Theatre, Volume Two, an album by Old 97s

== See also ==
- The Grand (disambiguation)
