= Roar-ee the Lion =

Mascot of Columbia University

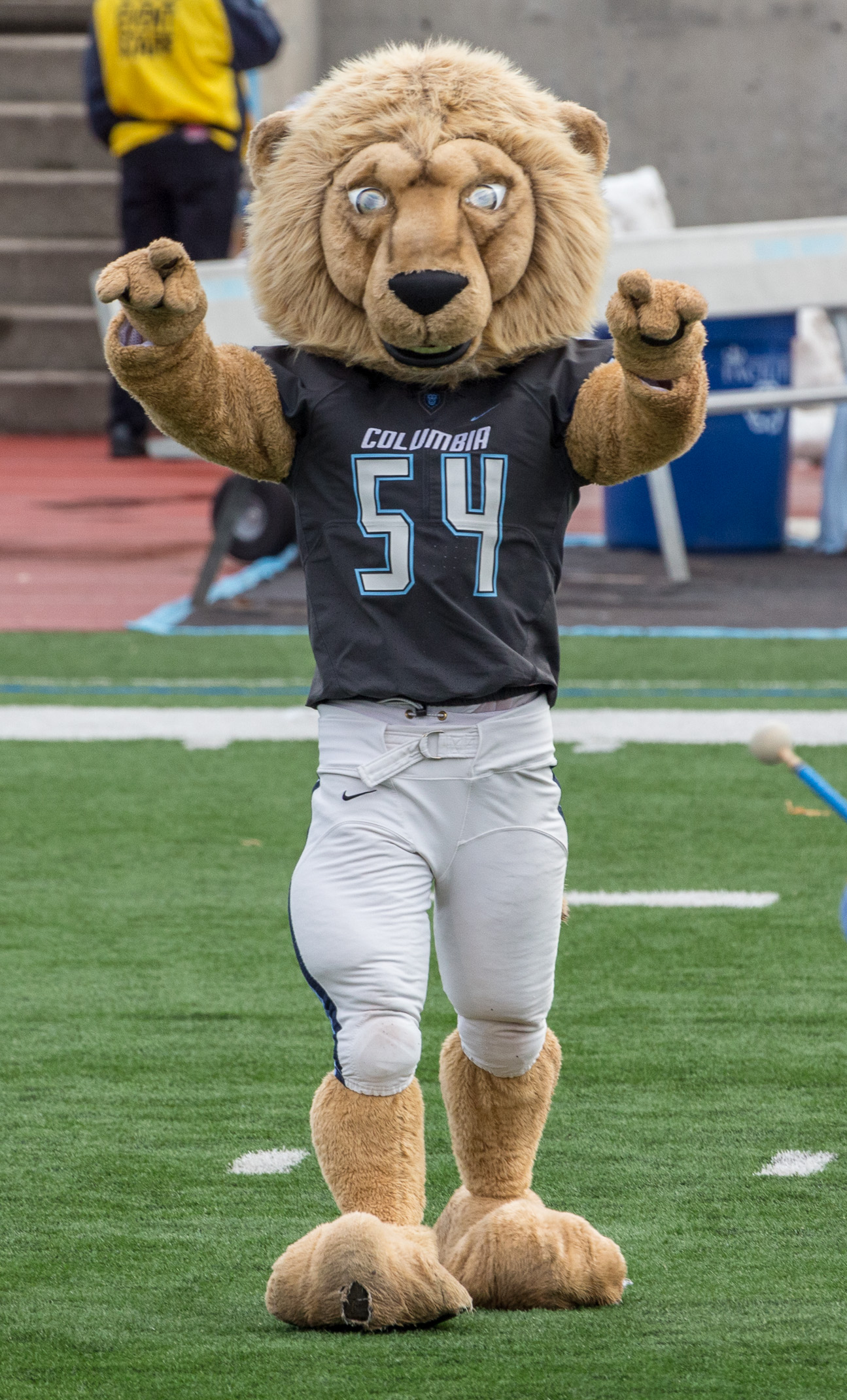
- Roar-ee the Lion at a home football game, 2018
- University: Columbia University
- Conference: Ivy League
- Description: Anthropomorphic lion
- First seen: 1910
- Related mascot(s): Matilda the Harlem Goat

Roar-ee the Lion is the official mascot of Columbia University and the Columbia Lions. First adopted in 1910, as the Columbia Lion, Roar-ee is based on the lion, a symbol of the university since its establishment under the charter of King George II in 1754.

Roar-ee, is an anthropomorphic lion, typically dressed in football attire, with the number 54 referring to the year of the university's founding. Roar-ee is meant to represent courage, dominance, and power. The current costume was introduced in 2005 before Roar-ee's 100th anniversary.

== History ==
=== Origins and adoption (1910–1920) ===
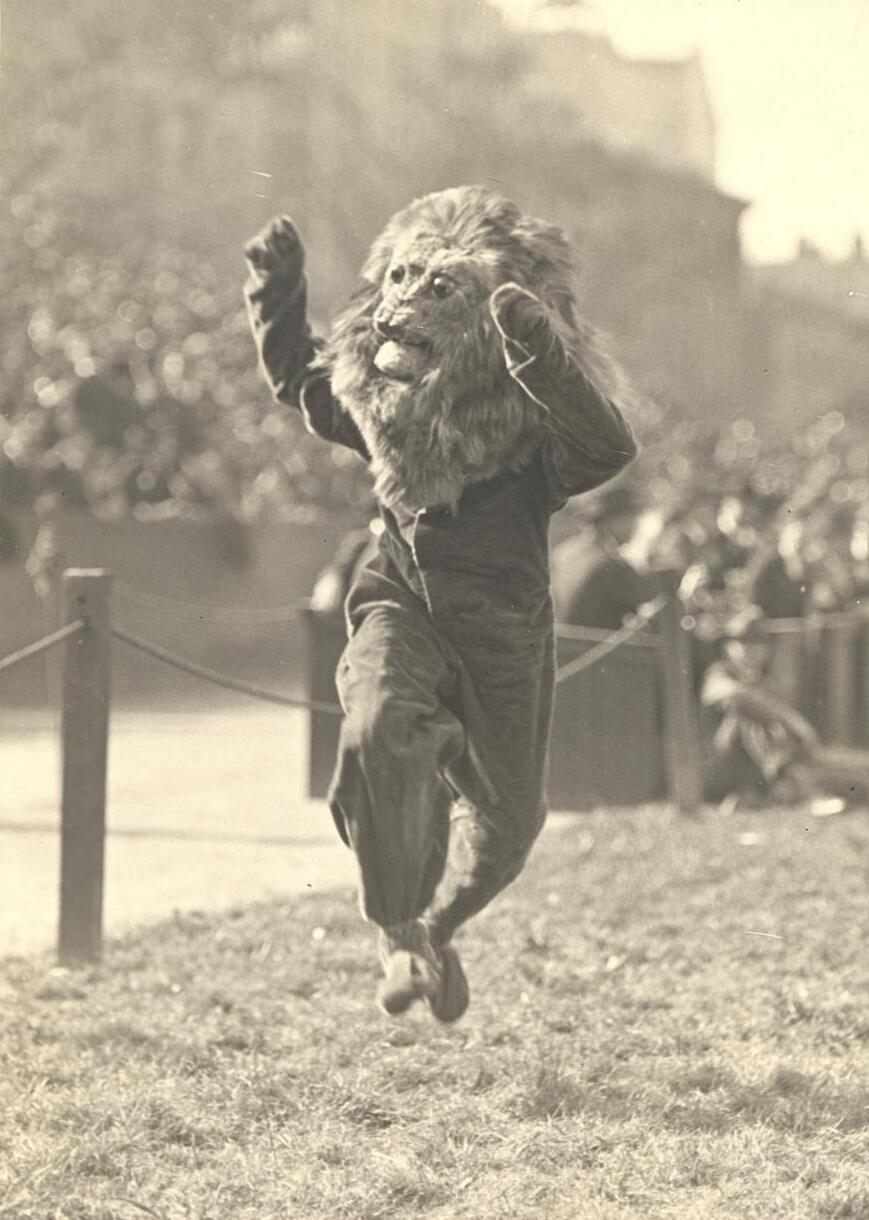
The lion at a football game, 1920

The idea of having a lion as the mascot of Columbia was first proposed by George Brokaw Compton at the April 5, 1910 meeting of the alumni association. The lion had been a longstanding unofficial symbol of the university, having frequently been used as a design motif on the university's campus even before its adoption. It was possibly derived from the coat of arms of King George II, under whom the school was founded in 1754.Its adoption was not uncontroversial, however. As the Lion, which was named "Leo Columbiae", was chosen in connection with Columbia's other royal imagery, a product of Columbia's colonial past, some considered it a sign of excessive conservatism and a symbol of "servility to British Royalty". The Eagle was floated as an alternative, in line with the university's patriotic renaming following American independence: "For Kings College, the Lion, but the Eagle for Columbia". The Goat, specifically Matilda the Harlem Goat, was also proposed, allegedly as a joke. Nevertheless, Leo was approved by the Student Board on May 4, 1910.

=== Live mascots ===
The first live Lion mascot used by the university football team was a German Shepherd named Chief, who was presented to the team in 1925 and used for a short period of time. On October 24, 1928, a freshman suggested in the Columbia Daily Spectator that the university acquire an actual lion to use at football games, claiming that lions "are not very expensive at wild animal dealers," and "would grow up well tamed, meek and mild" if purchased as cubs. Several days later, an alumnus offered to donate a live lion cub to the university to serve as its mascot, which football Coach Charley Crowley turned down out of safety concerns.

When the team travelled to Pasadena, California to play in the 1934 Rose Bowl against Stanford, however, it was determined by Crowley's successor Lou Little that the team required a live mascot for the occasion, though he was unable to find any lions available to rent in the region prior to their departure. An alumnus who lived in Tucson had offered a wild Mexican boar to the university, which Little vetoed. Luckily, upon the team's arrival the day before the game, they were greeted by alumnus Herman J. Mankiewicz with a lion on a leash. Little accepted, and Columbia would go on to win the game. In 1963, four students rented a 300-pound lion named Simba for a day from a theatrical rental agency in Manhattan to use in a game against Princeton. It was kept in a cage under the scoreboard.

=== Symbols around campus ===
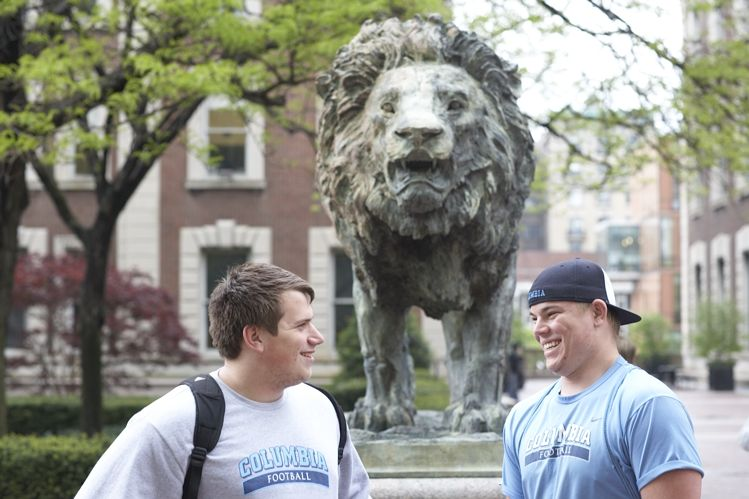
Football players chat before The Scholar's Lion

Multiple statues of the Columbia Lion have been commissioned and placed around Columbia's campus. A sculpture of a lion by Frederick Roth, donated by the Class of 1899, was placed at Baker Field to commemorate its opening in 1924. The Scholar's Lion, sculpted by alumnus Greg Wyatt, was unveiled as part of Columbia's semiquincentennial celebrations on April 7, 2004, and stands near Havemeyer Hall. It was a gift from the classes of 1971 and 1996. The logo for the Columbia University Athletics depicting the Columbia Lion was created in 1999 as part of a general overhaul of the department; its predecessor design, which was used throughout the 1990s, was often unfavorably compared to a head of cabbage.

=== Modern era (2005–present) ===
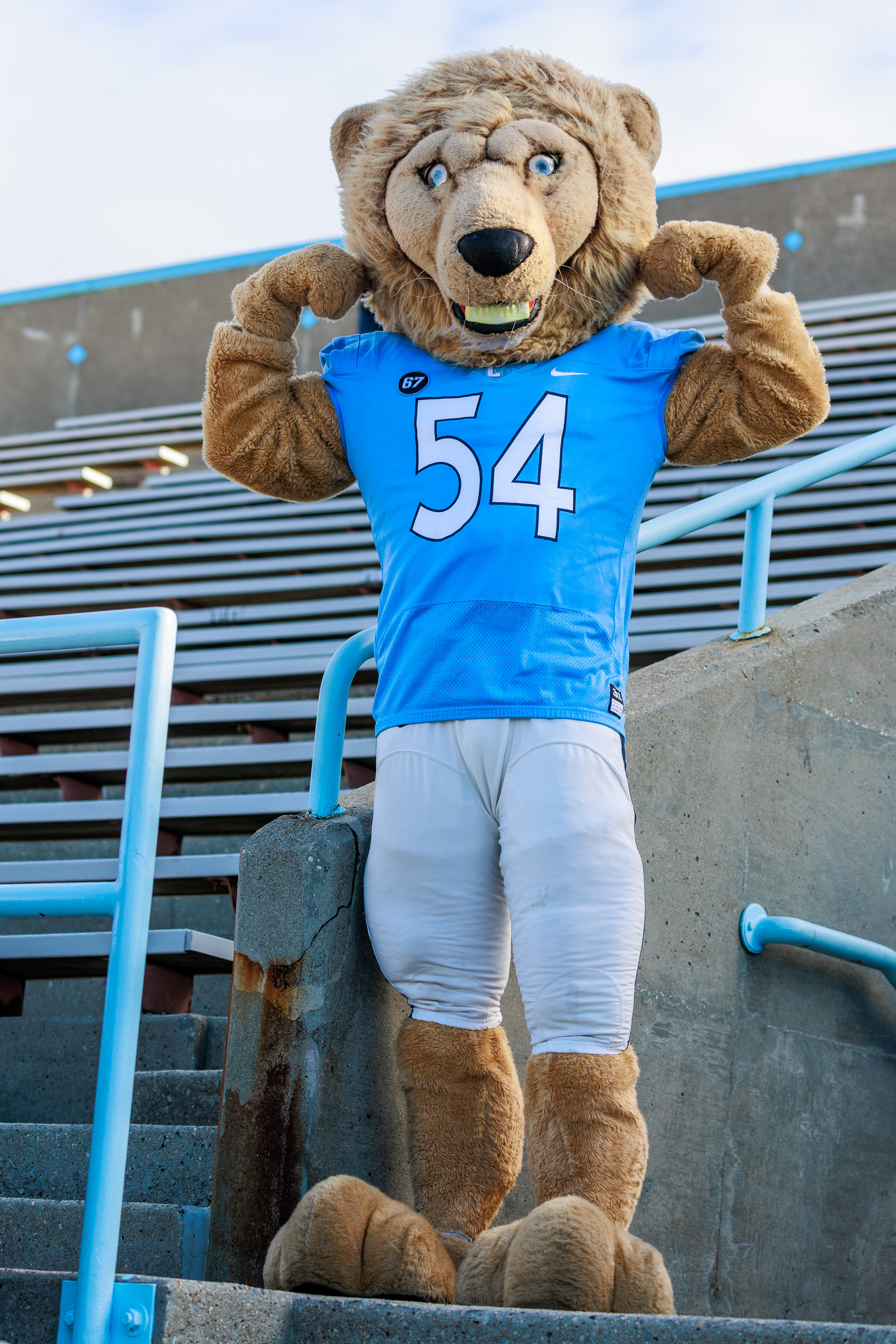
Roar-ee the Lion in 2024

In 2005, students voted to rename Leo Columbiae to Roar-ee the Lion. Other names in consideration included Hamilton, Hudson, K.C., and J.J. Along with the overhaul Roar-ee received an updated costume, debuting at that year's homecoming. Roar-ee appears at every football and basketball game, as well as private events in which he can be booked for through the Athletics department.

== Other Mascots ==
=== Matilda the Harlem Goat ===
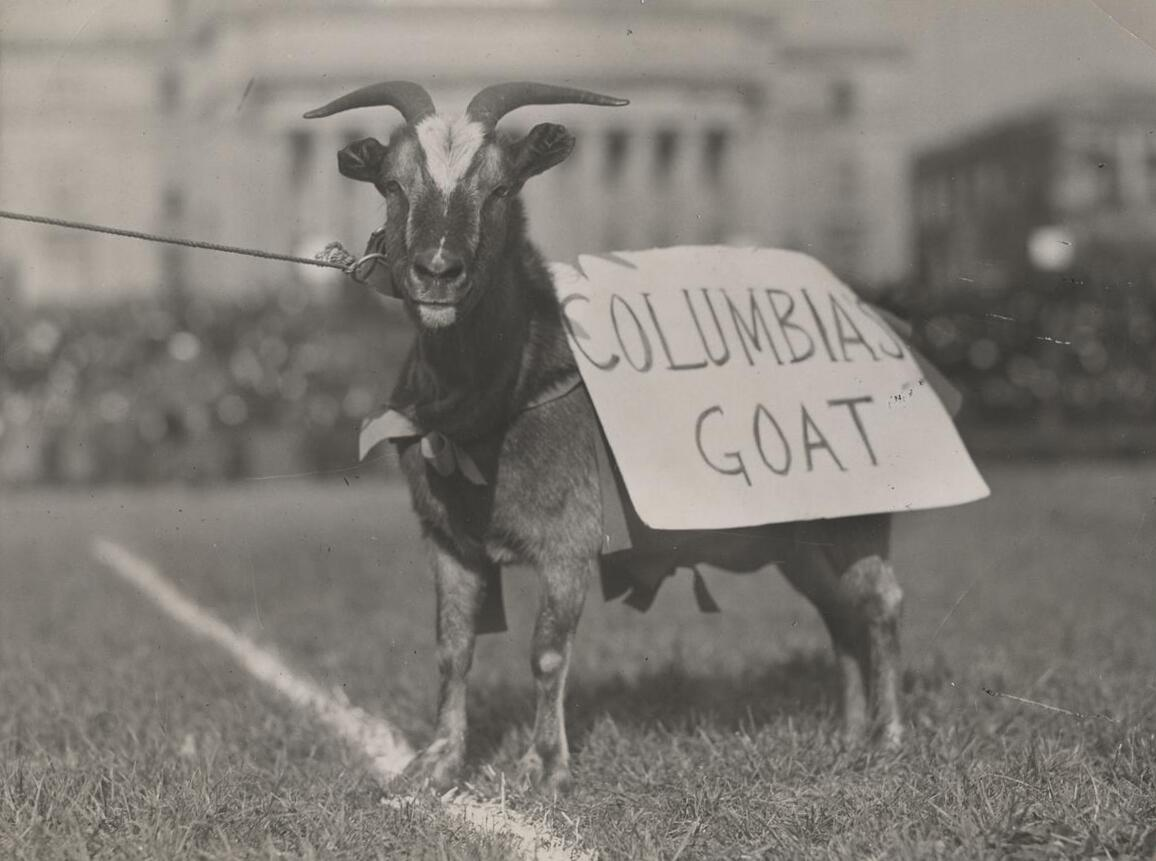
Matilda cheering on Columbia's athletes, c. 1910

Matilda was a goat owned by Patrick Riley, who squatted in a shanty on 120th Street and Amsterdam Avenue. She was often lent to Columbia students for hazing purposes, and in 1910 was nominated as Columbia's official mascot under the title "Matilda the Harlem Goat". The proposal was met with some resistance: one student, only going by the pseudonym "Amicus Leonis", smeared her in the Columbia Daily Spectator, stating that he regarded her candidacy "as a joke, as not being worthy of our institution and not at all appealing to any serious sentiment whatsoever." Though reportedly a large contingency voted in her favor, her nomination did not succeed.

The Last Goat in Harlem

Pale wraith of happier days, who sadly stand
Amid the relics of the simple life,
Apartment houses grace the rolling land
Where goatherds tootled on the horn and fife.
Where are they friends of Harlem's early days
Who once cavorted pungent on the green?
Thy Dionysian revels once did craze
Where now Apollo's coryphées are seen.
The strains of thy wild goat now are stilled,
The football chant resounds upon the heights
Where once your overflowing joy you spilled,
Wild youth cavorts on Springtime's balmy nights.
Soon may thy tattered hide be laid to rest
Among the bleating legions of the blest.

— Anonymous, 1926

Upon her death in 1914, Columbia students held a funeral procession for Matilda, for which they donned their academic regalia and sang a dirge called "A Harlem Goat". Her lifeless body was stuffed with sawdust and placed in a niche above the front door of Charles Friedgen's drugstore, which was located across the street from the Riley farm.

The store was purchased along with Matilda in 1929 by David Ratner, who gave her a "full beauty treatment" and displayed her in the store window. In 1956, the store was inherited by Ratner's daughters, who only four years later were forced to close it down; they intended to donate Matilda to a museum. This move was met with stiff resistance, and a petition was drawn up by students which called upon Matilda's owners to "save its mortal remains from the icy grasp of the New-York Historical Society," and for the university administration to intervene. Her current whereabouts are unknown.

Matilda was the subject of a 1956 children's book, Matilda, by Le Grand Henderson, which claimed that she had become an honorary student at Columbia and won a football game for the university by head-butting an inattentive fullback. The university denied these assertions.

== In popular culture ==
The Columbia Lion famously inspired the creation of Leo the Lion, the mascot of the Hollywood film studio Metro-Goldwyn-Mayer. Leo was designed by alumnus Howard Dietz, who served as MGM's director of advertising, and chose the Lion as a tribute to Columbia.
