= Grand Opera House, York =

Listed theatre in York, England

Coordinates: 53.95726°N 1.08186°W

Grand Opera House
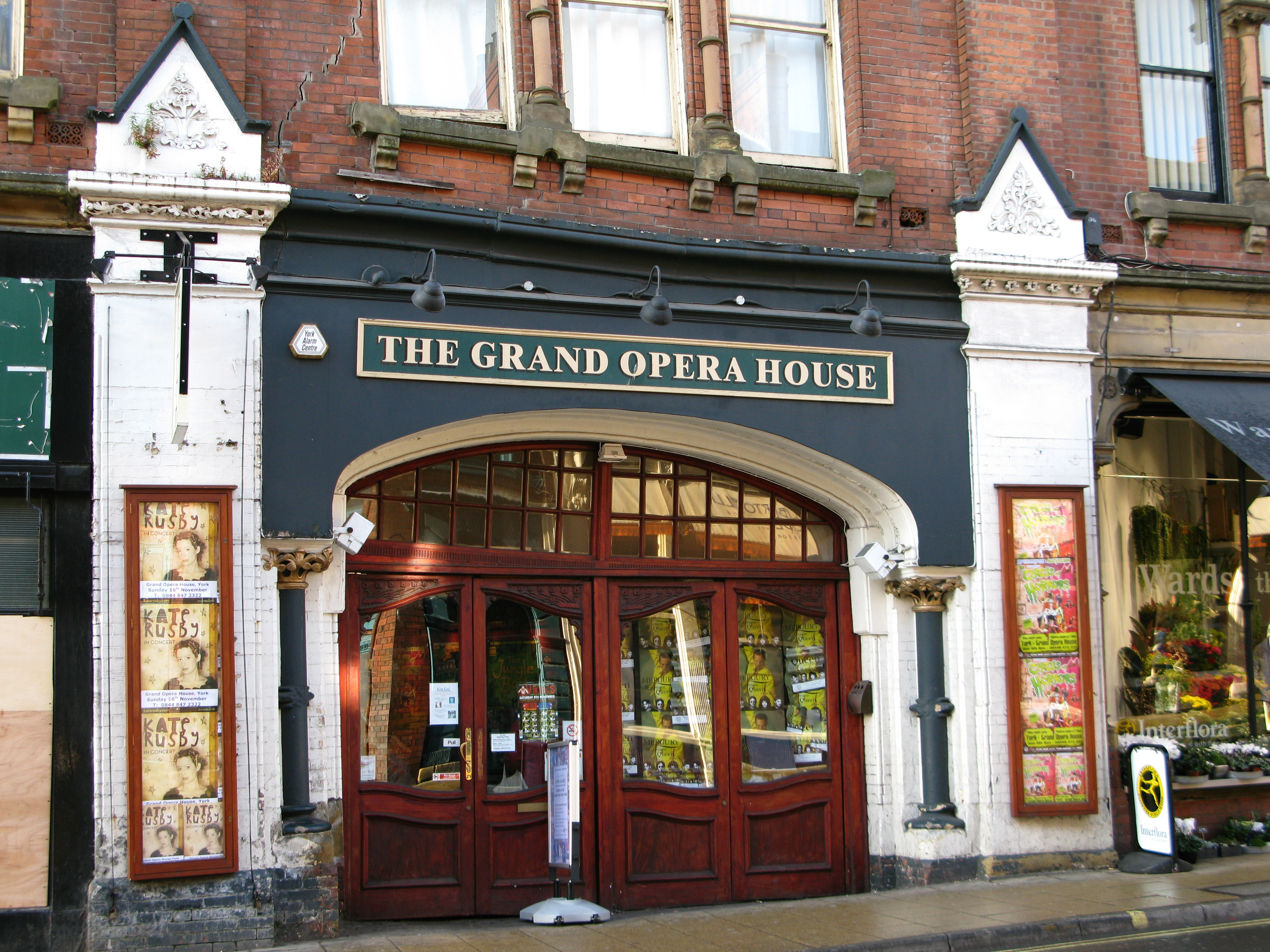
- Grand Opera House in 2008
- Interactive map of Grand Opera House
- Address: Clifford Street, York, England
- Owner: Ambassador Theatre Group
- Type: Corn exchange (1868–1902); Theatre (1902–1956; 1989–present); Bingo hall and roller skating rink (1958–1985)

Construction
- Opened: 1868; 158 years ago
- Renovated: 1902 (converted); 1989 (restored)
- Architectural style: Italianate
- Architects: George Alfred Dean (1868); John Priestley Briggs (1902)

Website
- Official website

Listed Building – Grade II
- Official name: Grand Opera House
- Designated: 28 February 1986
- Reference no.: 1257908

The Grand Opera House is a theatre on the corner of Clifford Street and Cumberland Street in York, England. The structure, which hosts touring productions of plays, musicals, opera and ballet, as well as one-off performances by comedians, and other theatrical and musical events, is a Grade II listed building.

== History ==
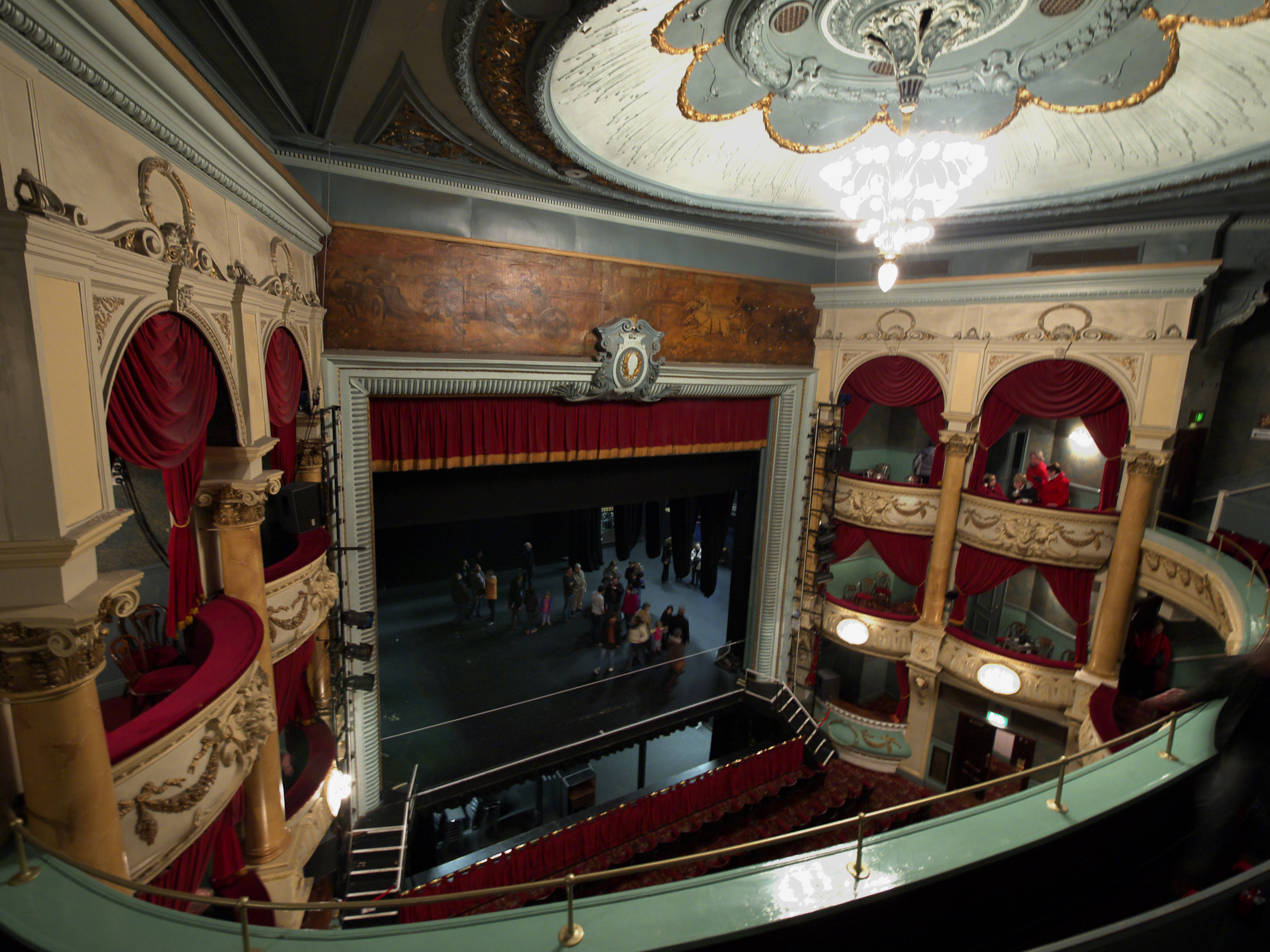
Interior of the Grand Opera House

The front part of the current structure was commissioned as a corn exchange in the mid-1860s. It was designed by George Alfred Dean in the Italianate style, built in red brick and was officially opened on 28 October 1868. The design involved an asymmetrical main frontage facing onto Clifford Street and featured a series of linked round headed windows on the first floor. Internally, the principal room was the main hall which was 74 feet (23 m) long and 63 feet (19 m) wide. However, the use of the building as a corn exchange declined significantly in the wake of the Great Depression of British Agriculture in the late 19th century.

In the early 20th century, William Peacock acquired the corn exchange and a warehouse located just behind it. The two buildings were brought together at a cost of £24,000, to a design by John Priestley Briggs, to create a music hall. Internally, the principal room was the main auditorium which featured raked seating, a proscenium arch and a stage. It was officially opened with a performance of a pantomime, Little Red Riding Hood, starring Florrie Forde, as the Grand Theatre and Opera House on 20 January 1902. In an attempt to appeal to a wider audience, it was renamed as the Grand Opera House & Empire Theatre in 1903.

The theatre showed silent films from an early stage. It was renamed the Empire Theatre in 1916, and then acquired by FJB Theatres, a business owned by Frederick Butterworth, in 1945. Butterworth closed it because of "the crippling Entertainment Tax" in 1956.

Ernest Shepherd, whose offices were in the Shambles, acquired the theatre in 1958 and renamed it the S. S. Empire (S.S. being an abbreviation for Shepherd of the Shambles). He removed the raked seating and stage so that it could be used as a bingo hall and roller skating rink. The S. S. Empire closed in 1985.

The building was acquired by new owners, the India Pru Company, in 1987. They restored the raked seating and stage at a cost of £4 million and re-opened it with a performance of Macbeth as the Grand Opera House on 26 September 1989. It got into financial difficulties in 1991 and briefly closed before re-opening again in 1993. The building was bought by the Ambassador Theatre Group as part of a larger transaction in November 2009.

== See also ==
- Corn exchanges in England
- Listed buildings in York (within the city walls, southern part)
