= Edwin Thomas Hall =

British architect

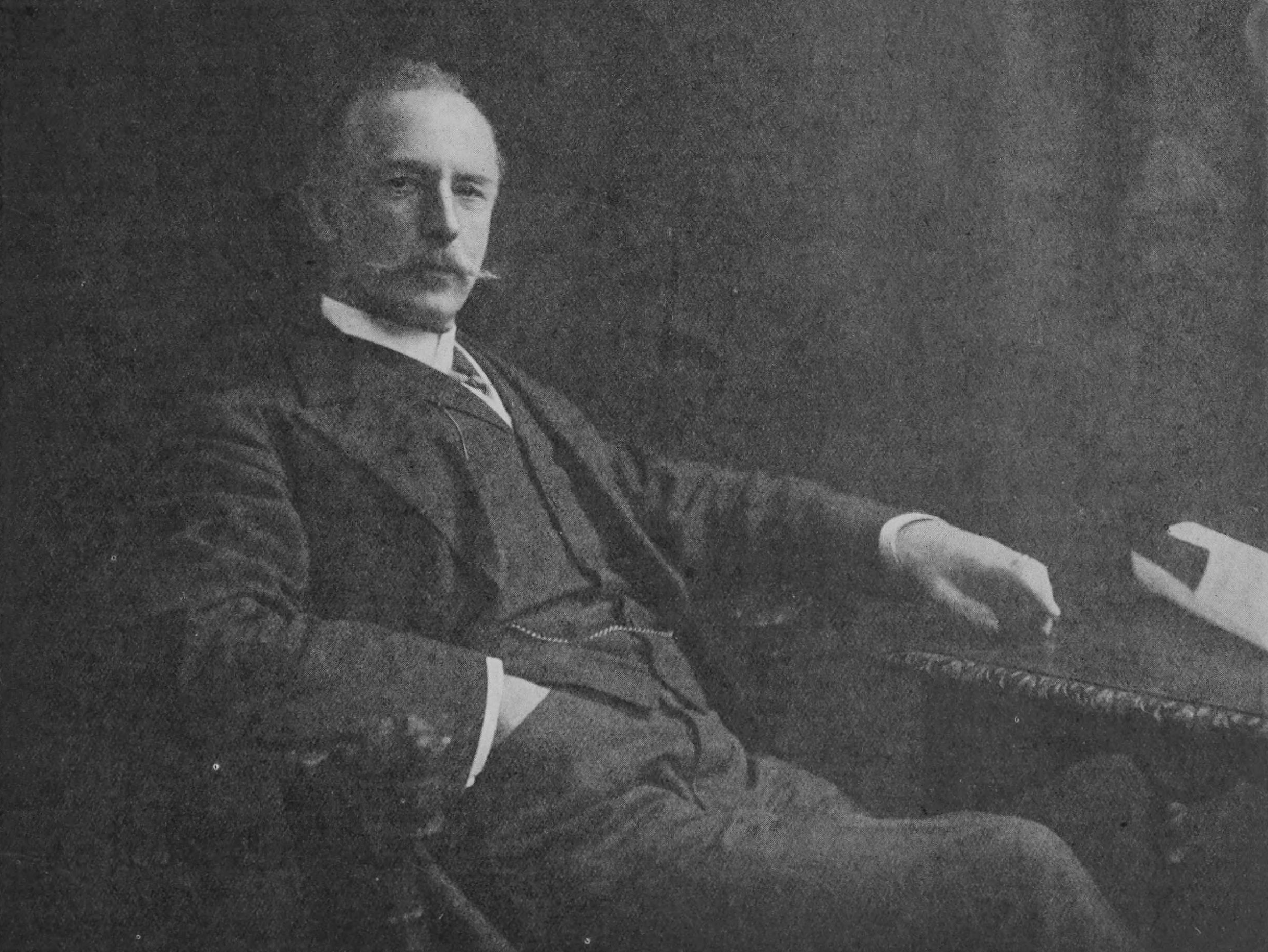
- Born: 1851
- Died: 1923 (aged 71–72)
- Occupation: Architect
- Buildings: Liberty & Co.

Edwin Thomas Hall (1851–1923) was a British architect known primarily for the design of the Liberty & Co. department store, the Old Library at Dulwich College (1902–03) and various hospitals. He was the brother of the architect George Alfred Hall and father of Edwin Stanley Hall, also a noted architect.

== Biography ==
Born in 1851, the son of architect George Hall, he started independent practice in London in 1876, and is best known for his work designing hospitals. He won the 1894 competition for the design of Hither Green Infectious Diseases Hospital and then a 1908 competition to design the new Manchester Royal Infirmary. The architect John Brooke was cited as "joint architect" with E T Hall in the design of the Manchester Royal Infirmary opened on 6 July 1909. He also designed two hospitals in Leeds, the Homoeopathic Hospital in Queen Square, London and several hospitals in Sussex as well as the St Giles Hospital in Peckham and the Camberwell Infirmary (both in London).

His large architectural practice also designed a number of factories, offices, churches, houses and flats. Amongst these are Sloane Mansions in Sloane Square and St Ermin's Mansions in 1889 (which became St Ermin's Hotel in 1899) in Westminster.

== Liberty's ==
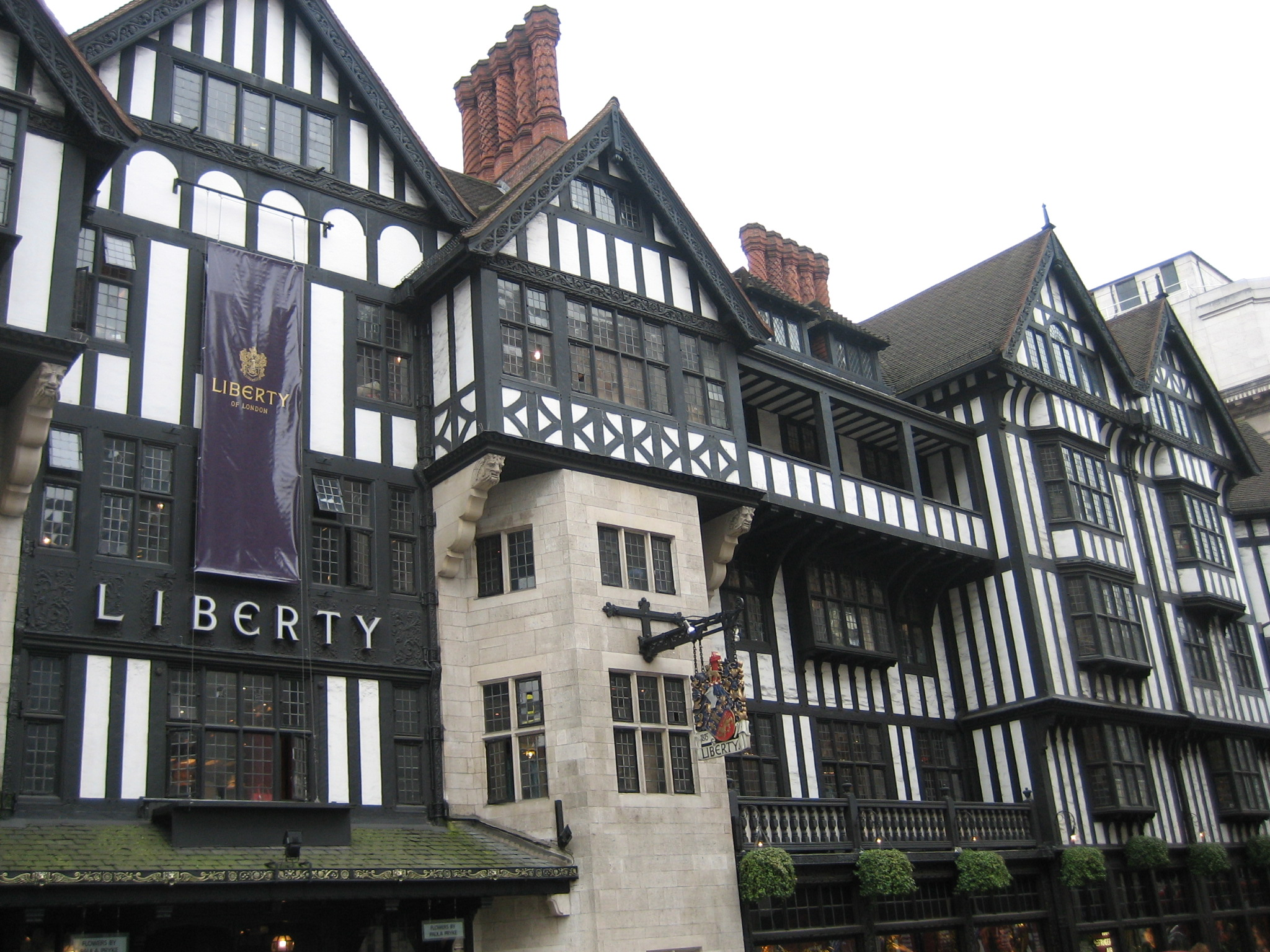
Exterior of Liberty's store

Hall's most noted work, which he undertook with his son, was the design of the Regent Street department store Liberty & Co., which is now a Grade II* listed building. Although the landowner, the Crown Estate, required all buildings on Regent Street to be in a classical style, Hall constructed the famous black and white timber Elizabethan-style frontage of Liberty's that faces on to Great Marlborough Street. Completed after his death in 1924, its mock Tudor style was designed around the ideas of the store's owner, Arthur Liberty. The timber for the outside façade was taken from old wooden sailing ships: HMS Impregnable and HMS Hindustan. The frontage on Great Marlborough Street is the same length as the Hindustan. Three light wells form the main internal focus of the building. Each of these wells was surrounded by smaller rooms to create a homely feel. Many of the rooms had fireplaces and some of these still exist.

The architectural historian Nikolaus Pevsner was very critical of the building's architecture, saying: "The scale is wrong, the symmetry is wrong. The proximity to a classical façade put up by the same firm at the same time is wrong, and the goings-on of a store behind such a façade (and below those twisted Tudor chimneys) are wrongest of all".

== RIBA ==
He was a vice-president of the Royal Institute of British Architects and was an active participant in drawing up the Institute’s charter in 1887. He was known as "Bye law Hall" not only because of his incisive legal mind but for the major part he played in drafting the updating of the London Building Acts in the 1890s.

== The Dulwich Estate ==
Hall was a governor of The Dulwich Estate for 22 years and its chairman from 1908 to 1910. In addition to the Old Library, his other local projects included Camberwell Public Library and Council Offices, and the completion of the British Home for Incurables in Streatham.

Hall also provided the initial concept for the Sunray Gardens Estate in Herne Hill, London. The advanced concept advocated a garden city layout with innovative integral community facilities. The estate, now a conservation area, was built by Camberwell Borough Council after World War I as part of the national drive to provide homes fit for heroes.

== Publications ==
Hall, Edwin Thomas (1917). Dulwich: History and Romance A.D. 967–1916. London: Bickers & Son.

== See also ==
- Liberty & Co.
- Dulwich
- Dulwich College
