= John Priestley Briggs =

English architect

John Priestley Briggs (1868–1944) was an English architect.

Briggs was born in Accrington, Lancashire, on 11 September 1868. He worked in the practice headed by the theatre architect Frank Matcham before starting his own architectural firm.

His works include:

- the conversion of an 1880s mansion block in St James's Park, London, to become St. Ermin's Hotel; it is now Grade II listed.
- the design of the former Grand Theatre, Doncaster; it is now Grade II listed.
- the conversion of a former corn exchange and warehouse to become a music hall; it is now a Grade II listed theatre known as the Grand Opera House, York.
- major alterations in 1899 to the Royal Court Theatre, Wigan; it is now Grade II listed.
- the design of the Opera House, Royal Tunbridge Wells, which was built in 1902 and is now Grade II listed.

Briggs married Florence Jane Watson in 1903. He died on 10 July 1944 in Polperro, Cornwall.
