= The Grand =

The Grand may refer to:

== Buildings ==
=== Official names ===
- The Grand (Calgary), a theatre in Alberta, Canada
- The Grand (Ellsworth, Maine), an arts center in Maine, U.S.
- The Grand Doubletree, condominium and hotel skyscraper in Miami, U.S.
- The Grand Cinema, a multiplex in Hong Kong

=== Colloquial naming ===
- Atlantic Club Casino Hotel, formerly known as Bally's Grand
- Grand Theatre (disambiguation), several cinemas and theatres
- Grand Hotel (disambiguation), several hotels
- Oshkosh Grand Opera House, Oshkosh, Wisconsin, U.S.

== Other uses ==
- The Grand (band), a Norwegian rock group
- The Grand (film), a 2008 comedy film
- The Grand (TV series), a 1990s British TV series, set in a Grand Hotel

== See also ==
- Grand (disambiguation)
- The Avenue (Milwaukee), an indoor shopping plaza formerly known as The Grand Avenue
