= Marjorie Maxse =

British political organiser

Dame Sarah Algeria Marjorie Maxse DBE, better known as Marjorie Maxse (26 October 1891 – 3 May 1975), was a British political organiser and the first female chief organization officer of the Conservative Party.

== Life ==
Maxse was the daughter of Ernest George Berkeley Maxse (18 November 1863 – 13 March 1943) and Sarah Alice Nottage-Miller (died 25 May 1908). In 1940, Maxse was appointed director of the Children's Overseas Reception Board and vice-chair of the Women's Voluntary Service for Civil Defence (WVS). In addition, she was also chief of staff for Section D (the "D" stood for destruction) of MI6.

Guy Burgess, the Soviet spy, worked for Section D and suggested to Maxse she should recruit his friend, Kim Philby. In his book My Secret War (1968) Philby described his first meeting with Maxse: "I found myself in the forecourt of St. Ermin's Hotel, near St James's Park station, talking to Miss Marjorie Maxse. She was an intensely likeable elderly lady (then almost as old as I am now). I had no idea then, as I have no idea now, what her precise position in government was. But she spoke with authority, and was evidently in a position at least to recommend me for interesting employment. At an early stage of our talk, she turned the subject to the possibilities of political work against the Germans in Europe."

== Honours ==
She was appointed a Member of the Order of the British Empire (MBE) in 1918 and a Commander of the Order of the British Empire (CBE) in 1941. She was promoted to Dame Commander of the Order of the British Empire in 1952 for her contributions and services to politics, gaining the title of Dame Marjorie Maxse, as she preferred to be known.

== Death ==
Dame Marjorie Maxse died on 3 May 1975, aged 83.

== Sources ==
- Charles Mosley, editor, Burke's Peerage, Baronetage & Knightage, 107th edition, 3 volumes (Wilmington, Delaware: Burke's Peerage (Genealogical Books) Ltd. 2003), volume 1, page 351.
