= St. Ermin's Hotel =

Hotel in London

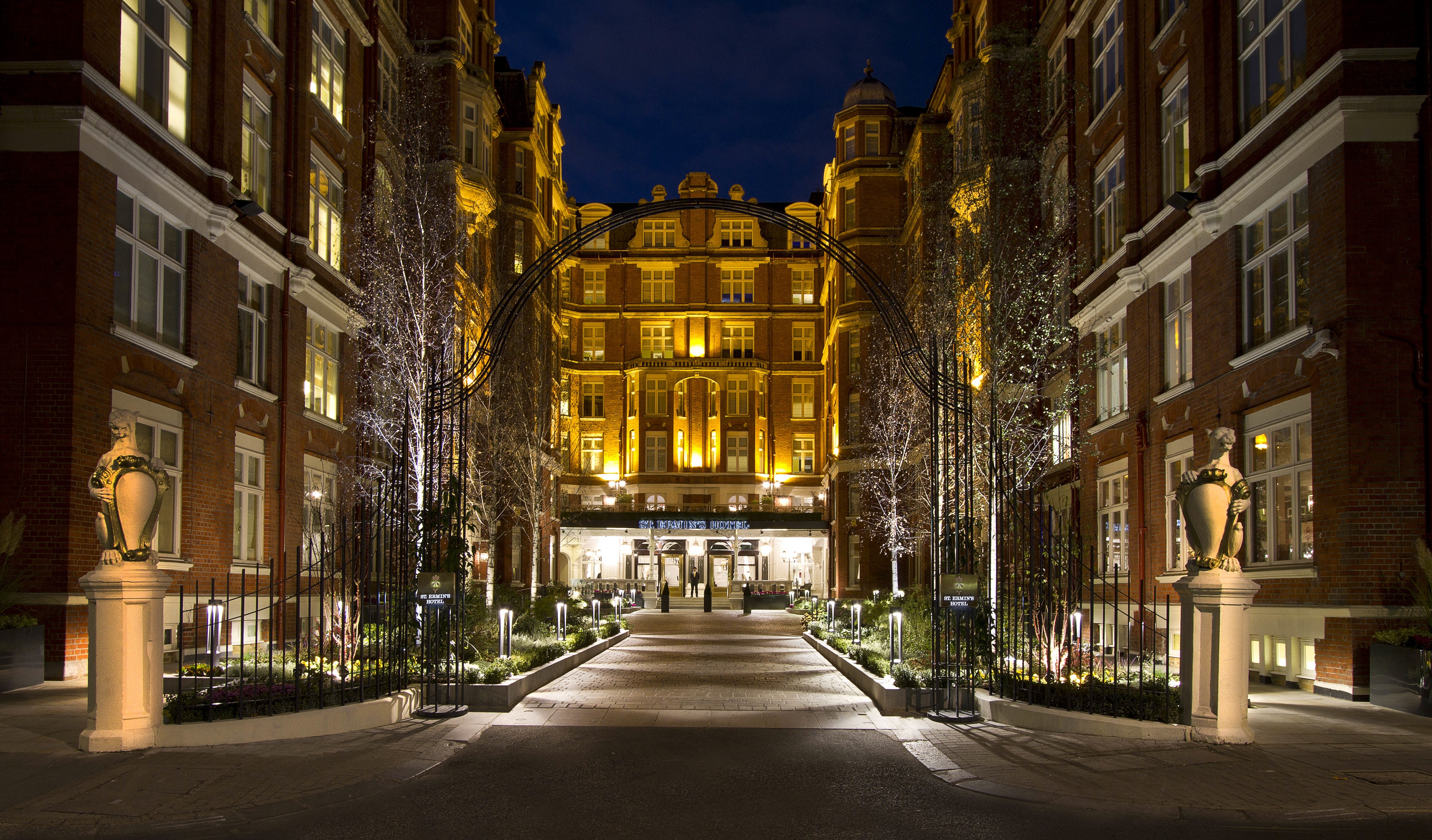
- The garden courtyard entrance
- Interactive map of the St. Ermin's Hotel area
- Hotel chain: Autograph Collection

General information
- Type: Built as a mansion block, then converted to a hotel
- Architectural style: Queen Anne revival
- Location: 2 Caxton Street, London, England
- Coordinates: 51°29′57″N 0°8′5″W
- Construction started: 1887
- Completed: 1889 (as a mansion block)
- Opened: 1899 (as a hotel)
- Owner: Tei-Fu Chen and Oi-Lin Chen
- Management: St. Ermin's Operating (UK) Limited

Design and construction
- Architects: Edwin T. Hall; John Priestley Briggs
- Designations: Grade II listed building

Website
- www.sterminshotel.co.uk

St. Ermin's Hotel is a four-star central London hotel adjacent to St James's Park Underground station, close to Westminster Abbey, Buckingham Palace, and the Houses of Parliament. The Grade II-listed late Victorian building, built as one of the early mansion blocks in the English capital, is thought to be named after an ancient monastery reputed to have occupied the site pre-10th century. Converted to a hotel in 1896–1899, it became a noted haunt of the British intelligence services from the 1930s onward, notably being the birthplace of the Special Operations Executive (SOE), and the liaison point between Cambridge Five double agents Philby and MacLean and their Soviet handlers. St Ermin's is now part of Marriott Hotels' Autograph Collection.

== Background ==
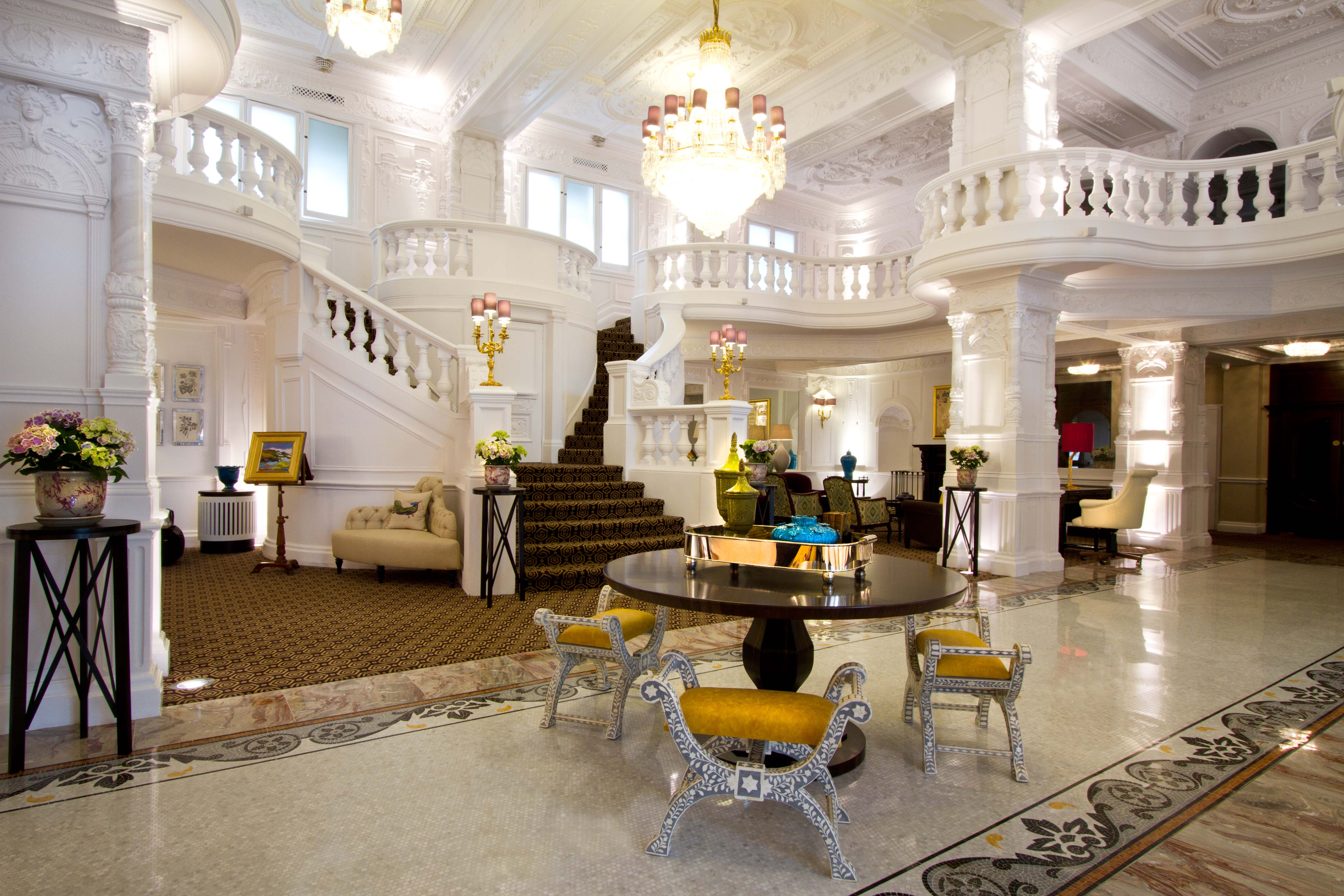
The newly restored lobby of St. Ermin's Hotel, with undulating balcony and rich plasterwork

St. Ermin's Hotel in St James's Park, London, was originally a horse-shoe shaped mansion block built in 1887–1889 to the designs of Edwin T. Hall (1851–1923). Mansion blocks (high-status, serviced apartments) were first seen in Victoria Street, London, in the 1850s and remain a feature of the area today. St Ermin's Mansions was typical in both plan and elevation; Hall employed the fashionable red-brick Queen Anne style for the exterior and grouped the apartments around a courtyard, which functioned both as a carriageway and garden for the residents. Four entrances led off the courtyard into the apartments (the two entrances in the side wings still exist in their original form to this day). By 1894, the building appears to have been extended along Broadway as far as St Ermin's Hill.

In 1896, the building was purchased with the intention of converting it into a hotel, and by 1899, the change of use was complete. Such conversions were not uncommon. Several mansion blocks at that time were built offering apartments with a bathroom but no kitchen. Instead, an army of servants provided service in rooms plus communal dining, reading, and smoking rooms provided ground floor reception areas ready made for the needs of a hotel.

The new owners embarked on a major refurbishment programme undertaken by the theatre architect J. P. Briggs (1869–1944), providing a spectacular sequence of public reception rooms with very rich plasterwork. Briggs remodelled the far end of the courtyard, creating a neo-Baroque space with raised verandah leading into a double-height foyer dominated by an undulating balcony at gallery level, accessed via a double staircase. In the eastern side of the building Briggs created a double-height ballroom with similar undulating balcony (reminiscent of theatre boxes) and unusual Art Nouveau plasterwork linked by anteroom with the former restaurant (now The Cloisters), the cove of which was decorated with lively rococo plasterwork.

Following a change of ownership in 2010 the hotel again underwent substantial refurbishment and its main entrance was updated.

== History ==
The medieval city of Westminster grew up along the approach roads to Westminster Abbey, including Tothill Street and its continuation named Petty France, from the French wool merchants who had settled the street. Just south of Tothill Street was the Great Almonry, dating from the 13th century and from where alms were distributed.

The site of the hotel itself, west of the Almonry, was then occupied by a chapel dedicated to St Ermin though both the Almonry and that chapel appear to have been demolished from around the 16th century and no trace of either now remains. Nevertheless, the network of alleys and paths that developed around such institutions over the course of the medieval period developed into the irregular streets that still pattern the area around the hotel today.

The residential population of Westminster rose appreciably from the 17th century, partly illustrated by the construction of St Margaret Chapel, originally known as The New Chapell, immediately to the south of the hotel site in 1636 and where English astronomer Thomas Street was buried in 1689. By 1869 it was rebuilt on a larger scale as Christ Church and demolished in the 1950s following bomb damage. The burial ground it stood around still partly survives as gardens fronting Victoria Street.

The mid- to late 19th century was an era of great change during which the area was transformed by the creation of Victoria Street in 1847–1851 and the construction of the District Railway. St James's Park underground station opened in 1868. Next door the hotel has the Caxton Hall, built in 1882–1883, famous for the first meeting of the Suffragette Movement in 1906, infamous for the revenge assassination of Michael O'Dwyer in 1940 and a celebrity civil marriage venue in the 1950s and '60s – Roger Moore, Peter Sellers, Diana Dors and Elizabeth Taylor all took their vows there, some more than once.

A suite of rooms in the hotel were taken by the Women's Automobile and Sports Association as their club and headquarters from 1929.

In 1965, a replica of Westminster Hall was created in the hotel's ballroom to allow soldiers to rehearse their movements for the funeral of Winston Churchill.

== Secrets ==
The St. Ermin's Hotel has a reputation for use by the UK's secret intelligence agencies. During the 1930s the hotel and the building at 2 Caxton Street were used by officers of the Secret Intelligence Service (SIS or MI6) located close by at 54 Broadway to meet agents and is well documented from March 1938 as the headquarters first of SIS's Section D, headed by Australian George Taylor and then as home of the SOE, working under "Statistical Research Department" cover. Among the more famous personnel known to have worked from offices in the building are Kim Philby, Guy Burgess, Laurence Grand, H. Montgomery Hyde and Eric Maschwitz.

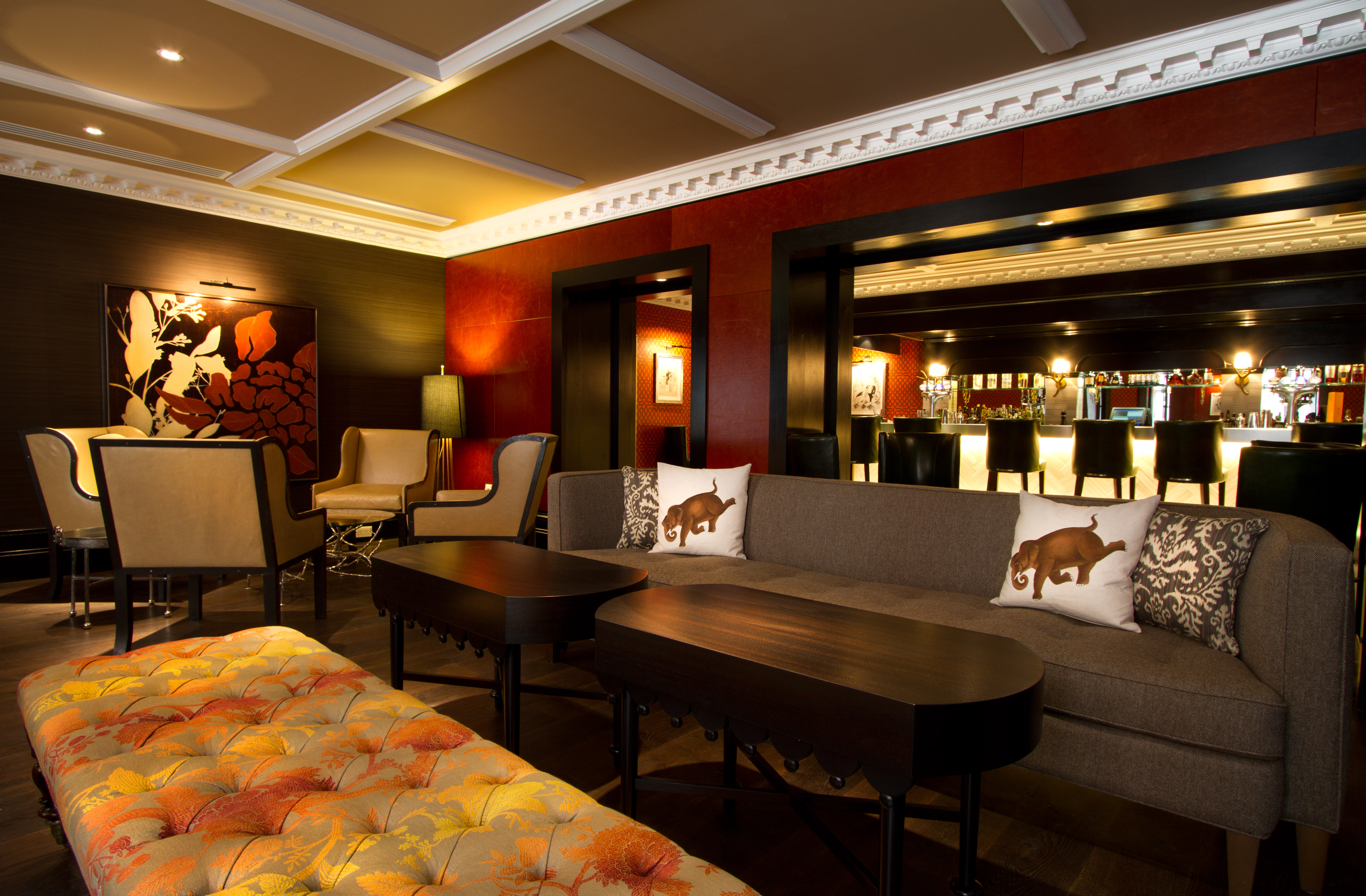
The Caxton Bar, noted meeting place of London's secret intelligence officers for over 60 years

Throughout the Second World War the building operated as a convenient annexe for SIS as it was surrounded by other secret organisations, including the London branch of Government Communications Headquarters (GCHQ) in Palmer Street; MI9 in Caxton Street; the SIS Chief's office at 21 Queen Anne's Gate; the SIS offices in Artillery Mansions on Victoria Street and in the basement of St Anne's Mansions and the MI8 listening post on the roof of what was then the Passport Office in Petty France.

In addition, the hotel was used regularly by SIS, MI5, and Naval Intelligence Division case officers, as mentioned in Snow by Madoc Roberts and Nigel West, while the SIS also interviewed prospective employees there, usually by Marjorie Maxse, the organisation's recruiter as detailed in Kim Philby's autobiography My Silent War. Shortly before the war the hotel was the venue for guerrilla warfare classes run partly by MI6, and among those working for 'King and Country' within that group at the time was Noël Coward, as well as art expert and member of the Cambridge Five spy ring, Anthony Blunt.

From 1981, the hotel was used by St Ermin's group of senior trade union leaders, who met secretly every month at the hotel to organise to prevent the left taking over the Labour Party. Four MPs also attended: Denis Howell, John Golding, Denis Healey, and Giles Radice. The group was created following the conference decision to establish an electoral college (40% trade unions, 30% members, 30% MPs) to elect the Labour Party leader and deputy.

== Ownership ==
St. Ermin's Hotel is owned by multi-level marketing and hotel firm Sunrider International, which is based in Los Angeles, California. It is part of Marriott Hotels' Autograph Collection.
