= Opera House, Royal Tunbridge Wells =

Coordinates: 51.13371°N 0.26380°E

Opera House
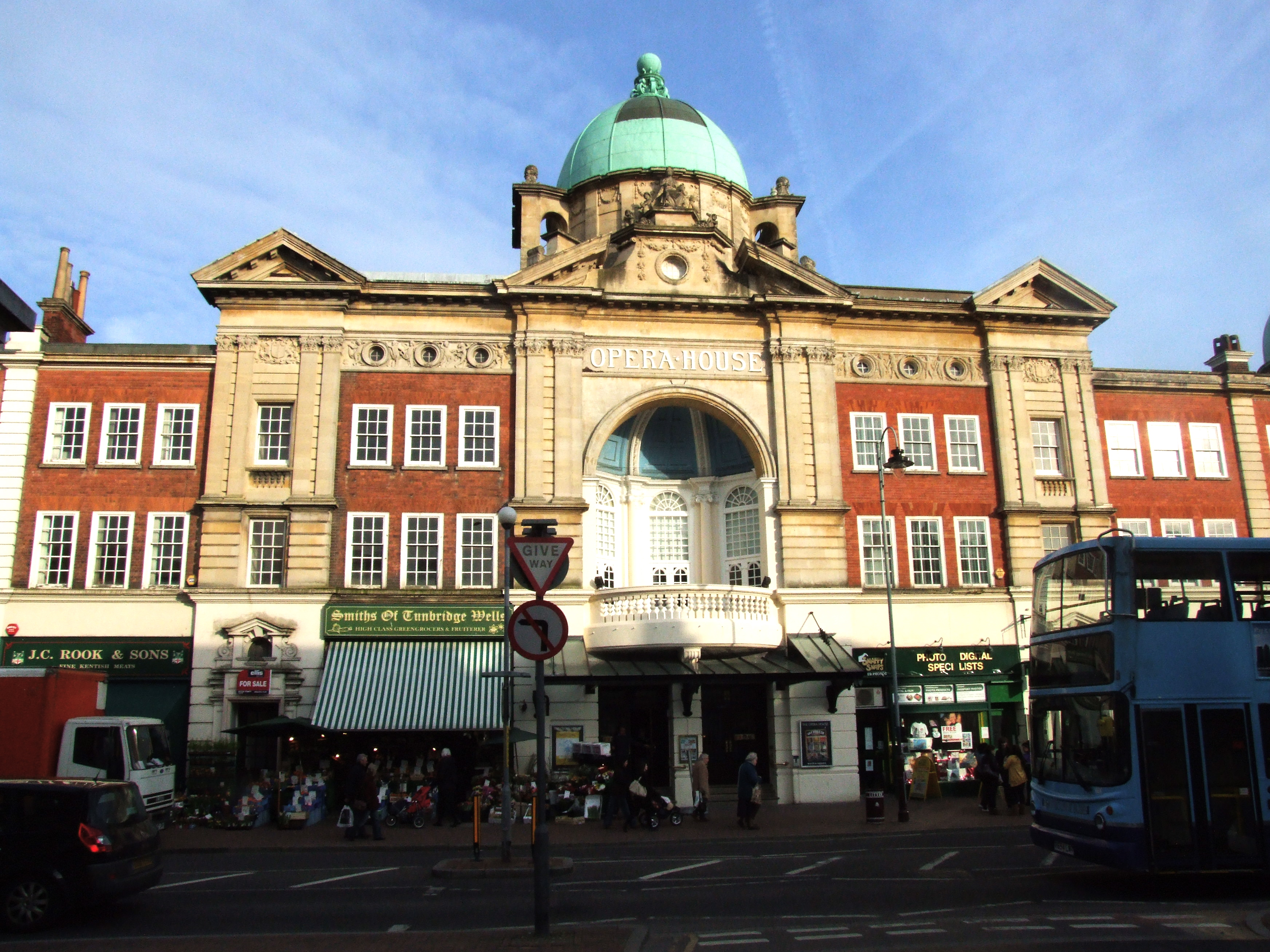
- The Opera House

General information
- Status: Open
- Type: Opera house
- Architectural style: Edwardian Baroque
- Location: Royal Tunbridge Wells, England
- Groundbreaking: 1901-10-10
- Completed: 1902
- Opened: 1902
- Renovated: 1996
- Owner: J D Wetherspoon

Design and construction
- Architect: John Briggs
- Awards: Grade II listed building

The Opera House is a former opera house and current pub in Royal Tunbridge Wells, Kent, England. It is a Grade II listed building.

== History ==
Construction was completed in 1902 to designs by architect John Priestley Briggs. When it was opened, it had a capacity of 1,100. In 1913, the Opera House hosted a series of charity fundraising concerts gather funds to rebuild the Nevill Ground's cricket pavilion after the original pavilion was destroyed in a suffragette arson attack. The Opera House was purchased by Union Cinemas in 1931 and turned into a cinema.

The Opera House was bombed in the Second World War. The bomb did not explode but instead got caught in the proscenium arch above the stage and set fire to the inside of the Opera House, leading to a renovation before eventual re-opening in 1949. It was later turned into a bingo hall in the 1960s after threats to demolish it. In November 1966, the Opera House was granted Grade II listed status.

In 1996, the Opera House was purchased by J D Wetherspoon and was turned into a public house. In 2006, the Opera House again hosted an opera performance, of Handel's Tamerlano. More recently there have been annual performances by Kent-based ‘The Merry Opera Company’ with Troy Boy, La traviata, The Magic Flute, Kiss Me, Figaro!, The Barber of Seville, and in 2016, La Boheme.

== Design ==
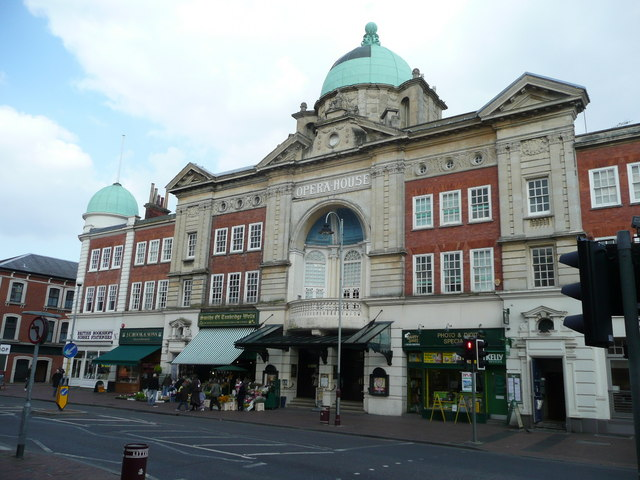
The Opera House

The interior was designed in Edwardian Baroque and Neo-Georgian styles. The exterior includes a Baroque dome on the roof. The dome originally had a nude statue of Mercury on the top, which was removed in the 1920s, either because it was unstable in poor weather or was viewed as sinful by local residents. In 1923, the main staircase was altered to include an 18th-century painting of revellers.
