= Sunrider =

American multi-level marketing company

Sunrider International
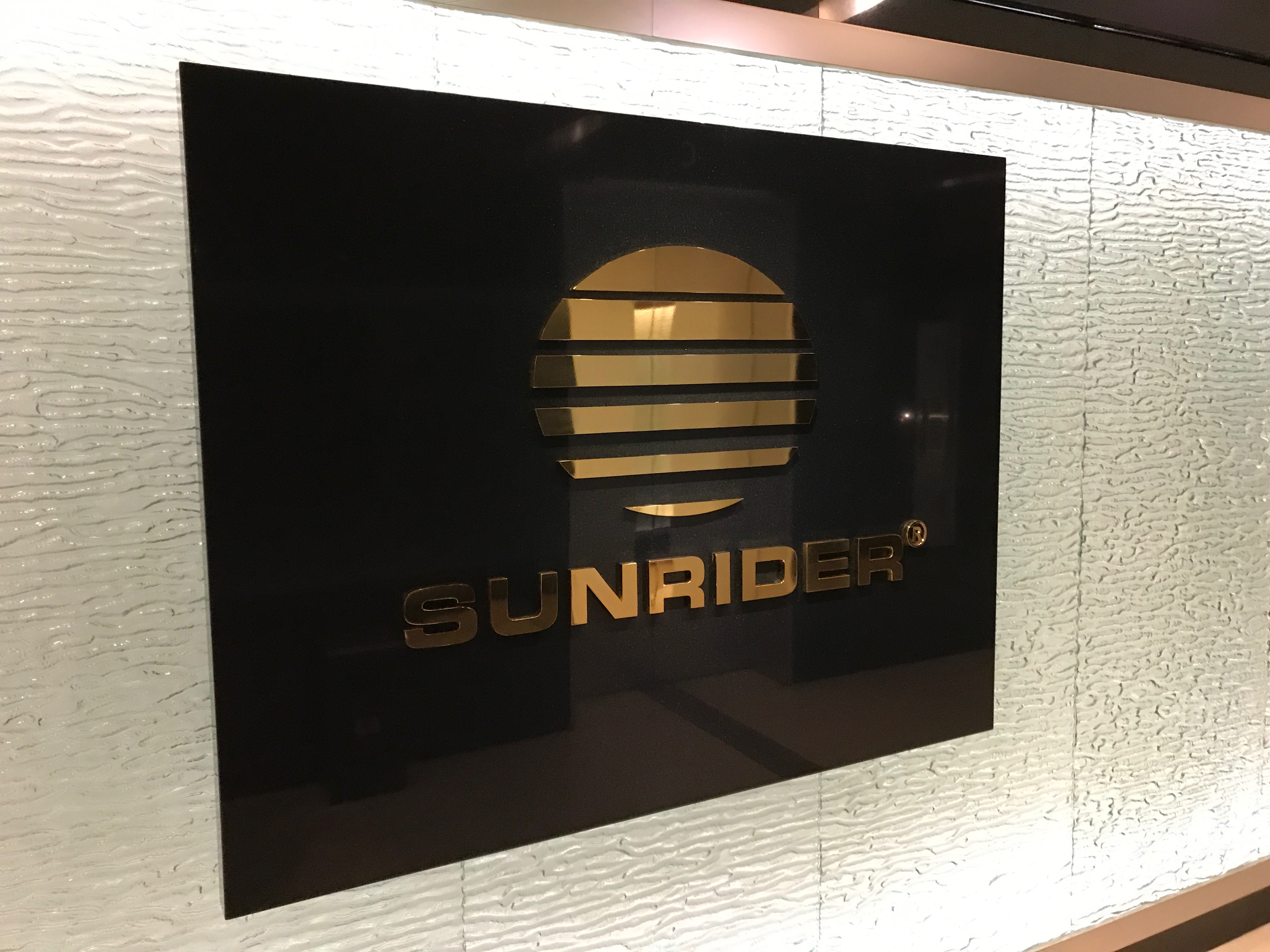
- Type: Privately held company
- Industry: Direct selling
- Founded: Orem, Utah in 1982
- Founders: Tei-Fu Chen and Oi-Lin Chen
- Headquarters: Torrance, California
- Products: Herbal food and beverages, nutritional supplements, sports and weight management, skin care, personal care, oral care, home care
- Website: www.sunrider.com

Sunrider International, or Sunrider Corporation, is a privately owned multi-level marketing company headquartered in Torrance, California. Sunrider lists thousands of franchise stores and tens of thousands of distributors internationally. Sunrider manufactures health, beauty, food, and household products at four manufacturing plants: Southern California, China, Singapore, and Taiwan. Sunrider does business in 42 countries, and operates offices in 22 countries.

== Company history ==
Sunrider was founded in 1982 in Orem, Utah in the United States by the Taiwan-born herbalist, Tei-Fu Chen. In the late 1980s, the company moved its headquarters to the Los Angeles area. It has since expanded into an international corporation with operations in over forty countries.

In 2007 Sunrider purchased the Holiday Inn Asiaworld Taipei and renamed it the Sunworld Dynasty Hotel Taipei, and expressed plans to purchase more hotels in Asia. Sunrider sold the hotel in 2020 to Fubon Life Insurance.

Sunrider has over 7,000 retail stores in China.

== Business ==
Sunrider is a multi-level marketing company which is primarily known for selling herbal products such as diet pills, teas, and health snacks. As of 2009 the company was reported to have an annual revenue of over $700 million, and 300,000 distributors.

=== Hotel business ===
Sunrider owns and operates a hotel chain called Sunworld Dynasty, having acquired several hotels in Asia. In Beijing, the hotels are the Sunworld Dynasty Hotel (on Wangfujing) and the Sunworld Hotel, located next door. In Taipei, Taiwan, the Sunworld Dynasty Hotel is one of the largest hotels in the city.

In 2015 Sunrider acquired the 297-room SLS Hotel Beverly Hills for approximately $200 million, purchased directly from Sam Nazarian's SBE group. The hotel is located at 465 S. La Cienega Blvd. Also that year the company acquired the historic St. Ermin's Hotel in London, England.

== Manufacturing of products ==
Sunrider International researches, develops, and manufactures all of its own products and does not outsource any production. The manufacturing process begins with buying raw herbs, sanitizing/cleansing the herbs, refining and concentrating, and packaging. This process occurs at all of Sunrider's four manufacturing sites in Guangzhou, China; Taiwan; Singapore; and Los Angeles. A fifth manufacturing plant is under construction in Kunshan, China, in the metropolitan area of Shanghai, China. The Kunshan plant will have nearly 1,000,000 square feet (93,000 m^{2}) of manufacturing space. The Los Angeles manufacturing plant was opened in July 2008 and also has nearly 1,000,000 square feet (93,000 m^{2}) of manufacturing facilities and space. In 2020, ground was broken in the Dallas-Fort Worth metro area for Sunrider's new manufacturing campus, which will open in the fall of 2022.

In 1987, salmonella bacteria were found in one of the company's products, which was immediately corrected and no cases of illness were reported.

Sunrider products are both kosher and halal, making them marketable and available to the Jewish and Islamic communities.

== Controversy & criticism ==
In 1992, Sunrider settled with a woman who claimed that the company's products had negatively affected her health. The case was settled out of court, even though the woman's estranged husband came forward with information about how poison had been added to the product after she received the products, rendering the lawsuit invalid.

In 1995, the Chens were charged with orchestrating a tax and customs fraud scheme to evade tens of millions of dollars in taxes. They were indicted by a federal grand jury on twenty counts, charging them with conspiracy, tax evasion, filing of false corporate tax returns, and smuggling.

In 1997, the Chens entered into a plea bargain with the court on the charges of tax evasion and customs fraud. Tei-Fu Chen served nearly a year in a minimum-security prison while his wife, Oi-Lin Chen, served six months of home detention. The couple paid over $100 million in back taxes, interest, and penalties, and an additional $4 million to avoid forfeiting the items they were accused of smuggling and undervaluing.

Psychiatrist and Quackwatch co-founder Stephen Barrett has accused the company of making false claims regarding its products' therapeutic effects and reported on legal problems the company has faced from the FDA and the state of California regarding false medical claims. The company has instructed distributors to avoid medical claims.
