= Justice LeGrand =

Justice LeGrand may refer to:

- Clay LeGrand (1911–2002), associate justice of the Iowa Supreme Court
- John Carroll LeGrand (1814–1861), chief judge of the Maryland Court of Appeals
