= Grand County =

Grand County is the name of two counties in the United States:

- Grand County, Colorado
- Grand County, Utah
