= Grand Theatre, Doncaster =

Former theatre in Doncaster, England

Coordinates: 53°31′22″N 1°08′17″W

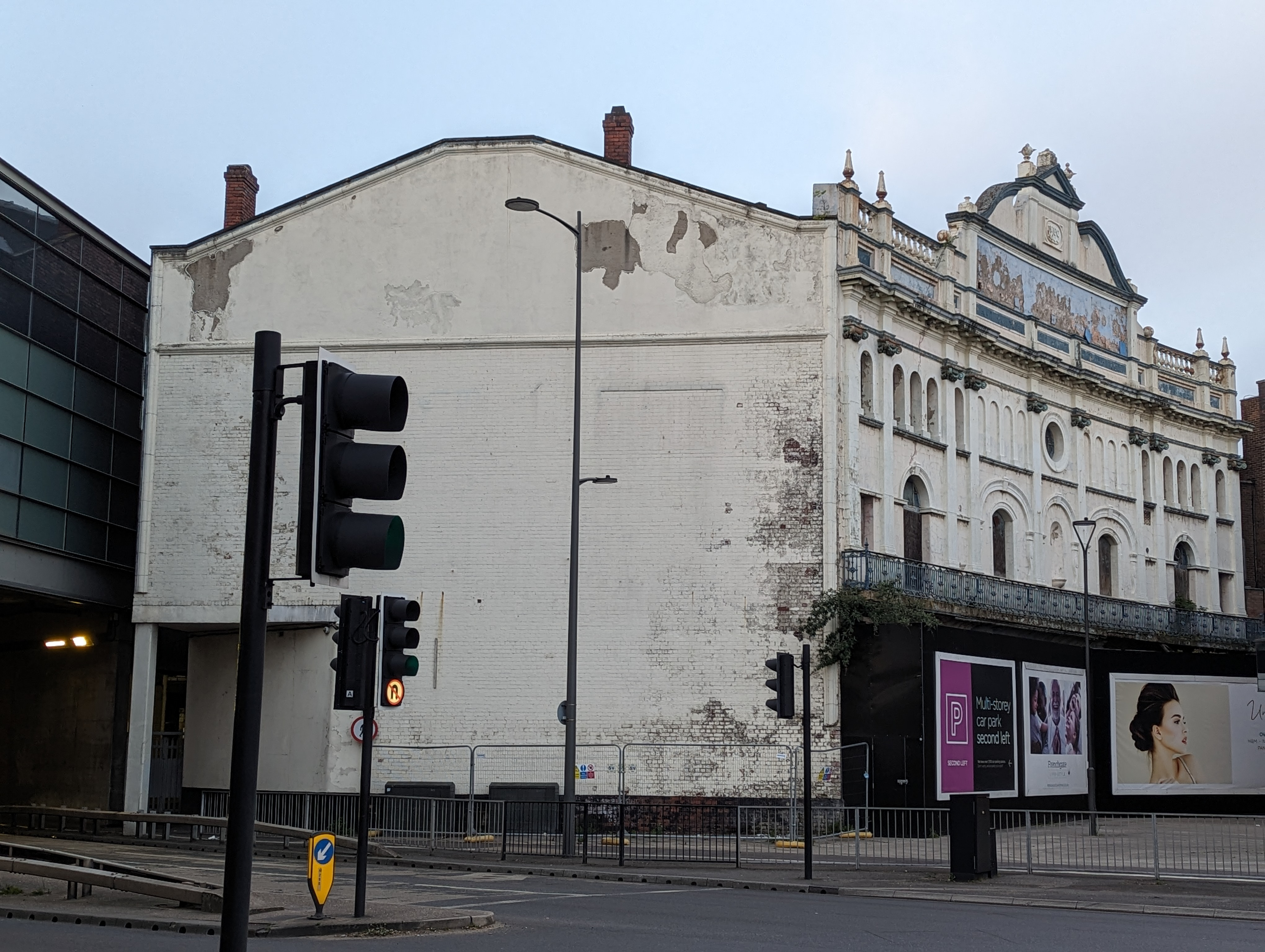
The theatre, in 2024

The Grand Theatre is a closed theatre in Doncaster, in South Yorkshire in England.

Station Road in Doncaster was widened in 1882. Following this, Frederick William Masters constructed a new circus hall on the street, noted for its lower walls being six feet thick, in order to support the weight of the elephants. The building was soon sold to the Salvation Army, and then in 1896 to J. W. Chapman, who renamed it the "People's Picture Palace", and showed the first films in the town.

Chapman had previously run a small theatre in Doncaster Market Place, and in 1898 he had the hall rebuilt as a new theatre, to a design by John Priestley Briggs. Part of the frontage was retained. It opened on 27 March 1899, with a performance of "la Poupee". In the 1930s, the theatre was altered, with its capacity reduced from 1,600 to 1,300. In the 1960s, the Arndale Centre was constructed in the area, with the other properties on Station Road demolished, but the theatre was retained. The theatre became a bingo hall in 1963, and closed in 1995. It was Grade II listed in 1994.

In 2006, the building was added to the new Theatres at Risk Register. In 2021, a study was undertaken into reopening the building as a theatre. It concluded that it could be viable, with a reduced capacity of 400 to 500, but would have to be reopened on a phased basis, and that urgent repair works were needed first.

The three-storey theatre is built of brick, with a painted stucco facade. The front is curved, and the ground floor has Doric pilasters and round arched doorways. There is a full-length cast iron balcony on the first floor, and the upper floors are decorated with Ionic pilasters and various round-headed arches, some containing doors and windows and others blank. Inside, there are two curved galleries, a stage with a proscenium arch, and a decorative plaster ceiling.

== See also ==
- Listed buildings in Doncaster (Town Ward)
