= Grand Hotel, Buenos Aires =

Hotel in Buenos Aires, Argentina

Coordinates: 34°36′29″S 58°22′30″W

Grand Hotel
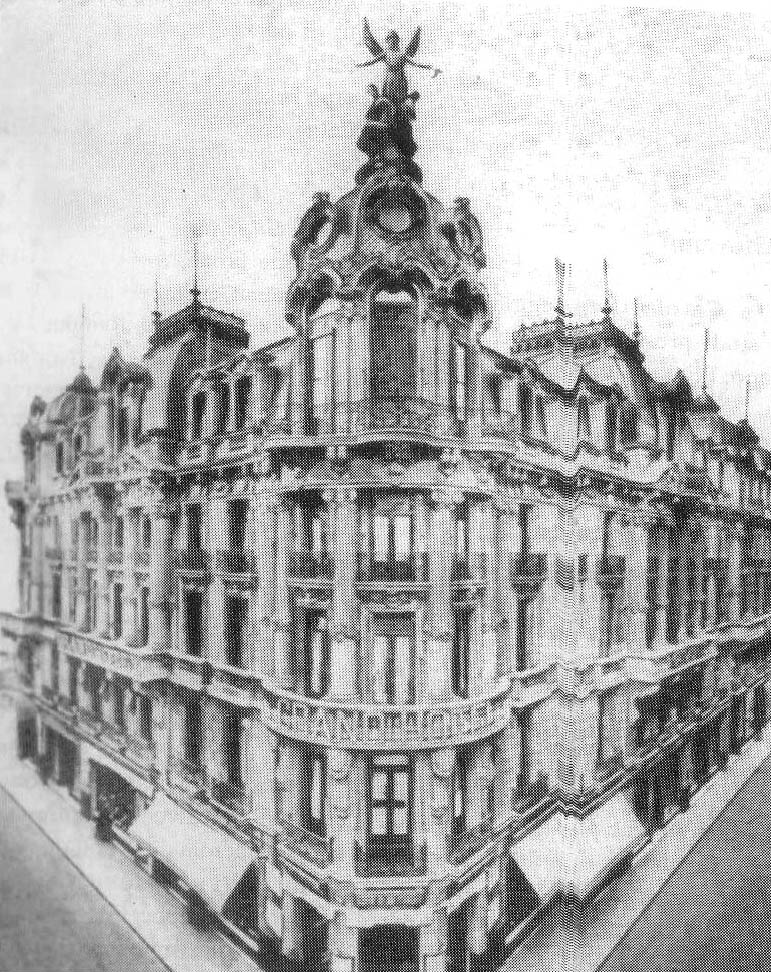
- The Grand Hotel, Buenos Aires c. 1901
- Interactive map of the Grand Hotel area

General information
- Location: Florida 1 Buenos Aires, Argentina
- Inaugurated: 1901
- Closed: 1957
- Owner: La Previsora

Technical details
- Floor count: 5

Design and construction
- Architect: Augusto Plou

Other information
- Number of rooms: 94
- Number of suites: 25

The Grand Hotel (Spanish: El Grand Hotel), Buenos Aires was a building that occupied the corner of Rivadavia and Florida streets in Buenos Aires. One of the most luxurious hotels at the turn of the 20th century, it welcomed personalities from politics and culture, taking advantage of its central location. It was demolished in the 1960s, and in its place the Palacio de las Sociedades Anónimas (Palace of Joint-Stock Companies) was constructed.

== History ==
Designed by Augusto Plou for the La Previsora Insurance Company, who also owned the Metropole and London hotels, the Grand Hotel opened its doors in 1901 as one of Buenos Aires' most luxurious establishments. Built on a plot which had previously housed the mansion of Flora Azcuénaga, construction took 18 months. It was initially managed by Ansermin and Phews, and the hotel attracted renowned guests such as Rubén Darío and Lucio V. Mansilla. However, with the advent of international hotels including the Palace Hotel and the Plaza Hotel, the Grand Hotel's popularity waned. After being converted into apartments in 1948, it was eventually acquired and demolished by the Argentine Chamber of Commerce in 1957 to make way for their new headquarters, completed in 1969.

== Architecture ==
Designed in the French Academic style, following the precepts of the École des Beaux-Arts de Paris, the Grand Hotel featured a basement, ground floor, and four upper floors, the topmost being a mansard. The corner was crowned by a dome with a bronze statue representing the La Previsora logo, and several metal roofed turrets adorned the mansard. In these details, the building bore resemblance to the Hotel Metropole, also designed by architect Plou for the same company. The hotel's entrance was located at the corner of Florida and Rivadavia streets, leading through a spacious corridor to the main hall, which was accessed by galleries on all floors and was topped by a large skylight to provide natural illumination. The rest of the ground floor was occupied by commercial rental spaces, while the first floor housed the guest dining room. The subsequent floors accommodated 94 rooms and 25 private suites.
