= Chang'an Grand Theater =

Chinese opera house

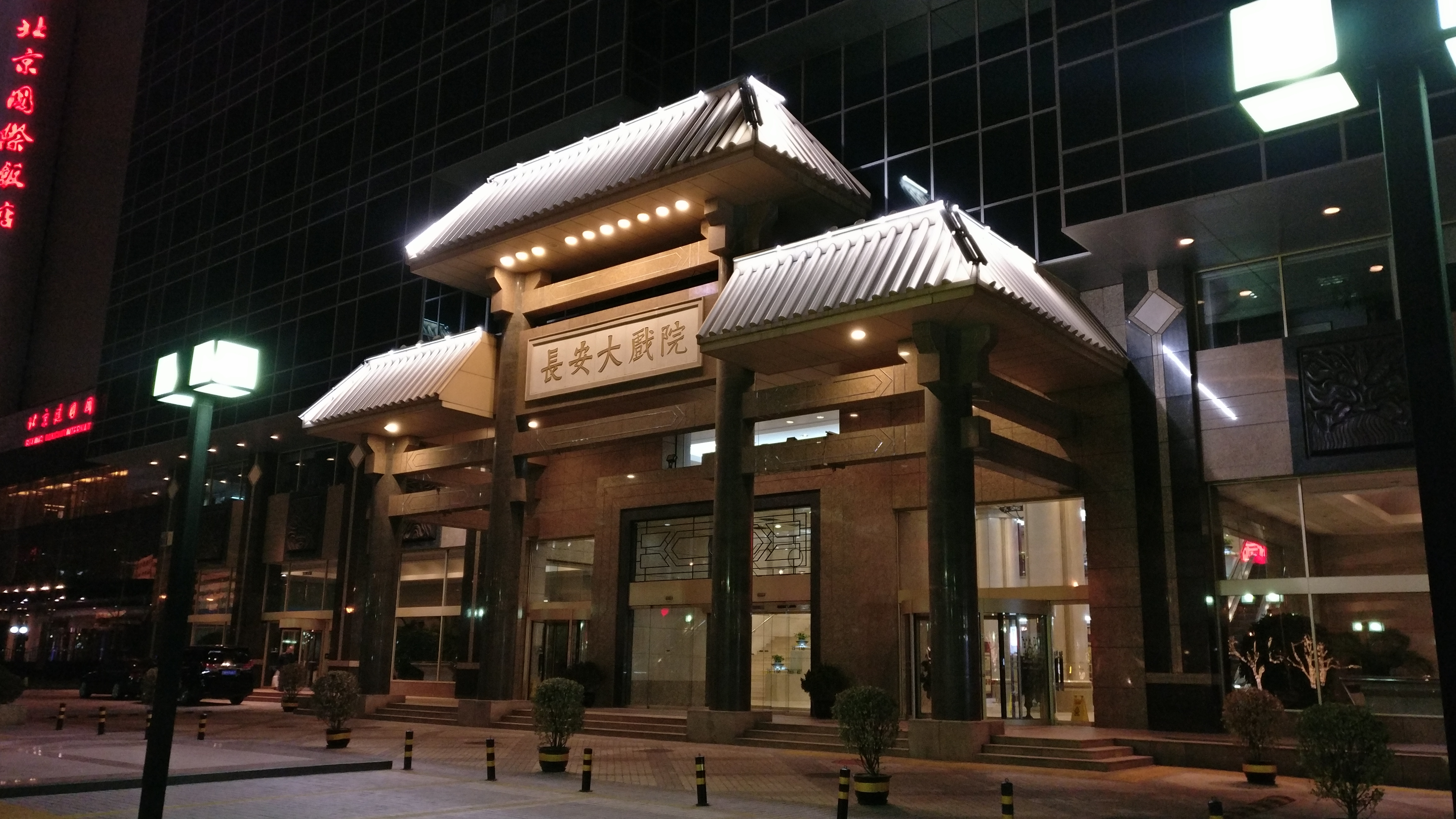
- Interactive map of Chang'an Grand Theater
- Location: Jianguomen Subdistrict, Dongcheng District, Beijing, China
- Coordinates: 39.9079°N 116.4198°E
- Event: Chinese opera (mainly Peking opera)

Construction
- Opened: 1996

Website
- www.changandaxiyuan.com

The Chang'an Grand Theater (simplified Chinese: 长安大戏院; traditional Chinese: 長安大戲院; pinyin: Cháng'ān Dà Xìyuàn), located on East Chang'an Avenue, is a theatre in Beijing that specializes in Peking Opera performances. Opened in 1996, the Chang'an Grand Theater is a modern Peking Opera theatre which displays modern facilities such as advanced highlights, multi-functional stage and computer-controlled sound and light systems. In its interior, it features a Ming Dynasty design and traditional Peking Opera theatre decorations. It is one of Beijing's most popular Peking Opera theatres, and because of its modern design, it is regarded as one of the best Peking Opera theatres for acoustics. Unlike many other opera theatres, it features English subtitles above the stage. The theatre's second floor also contains a museum which exhibits Peking Opera costumes, make-up and artifacts.
