= Le Grand =

Le Grand may refer to:

Places

- Le Grand, Alabama
- Le Grand, California
- Le Grand, Iowa

People

- Le Grand Henderson, American author

Other

- Le Grand, another name for Sikorsky Russky Vityaz, the first four-engine aircraft in the world built in Russia by Sikorski

== See also ==
- Legrand (disambiguation)
