= Grand Hotel Traian =

Hotel in Iași, Romania

Coordinates: 47°9′58.4″N 27°34′45.63″E

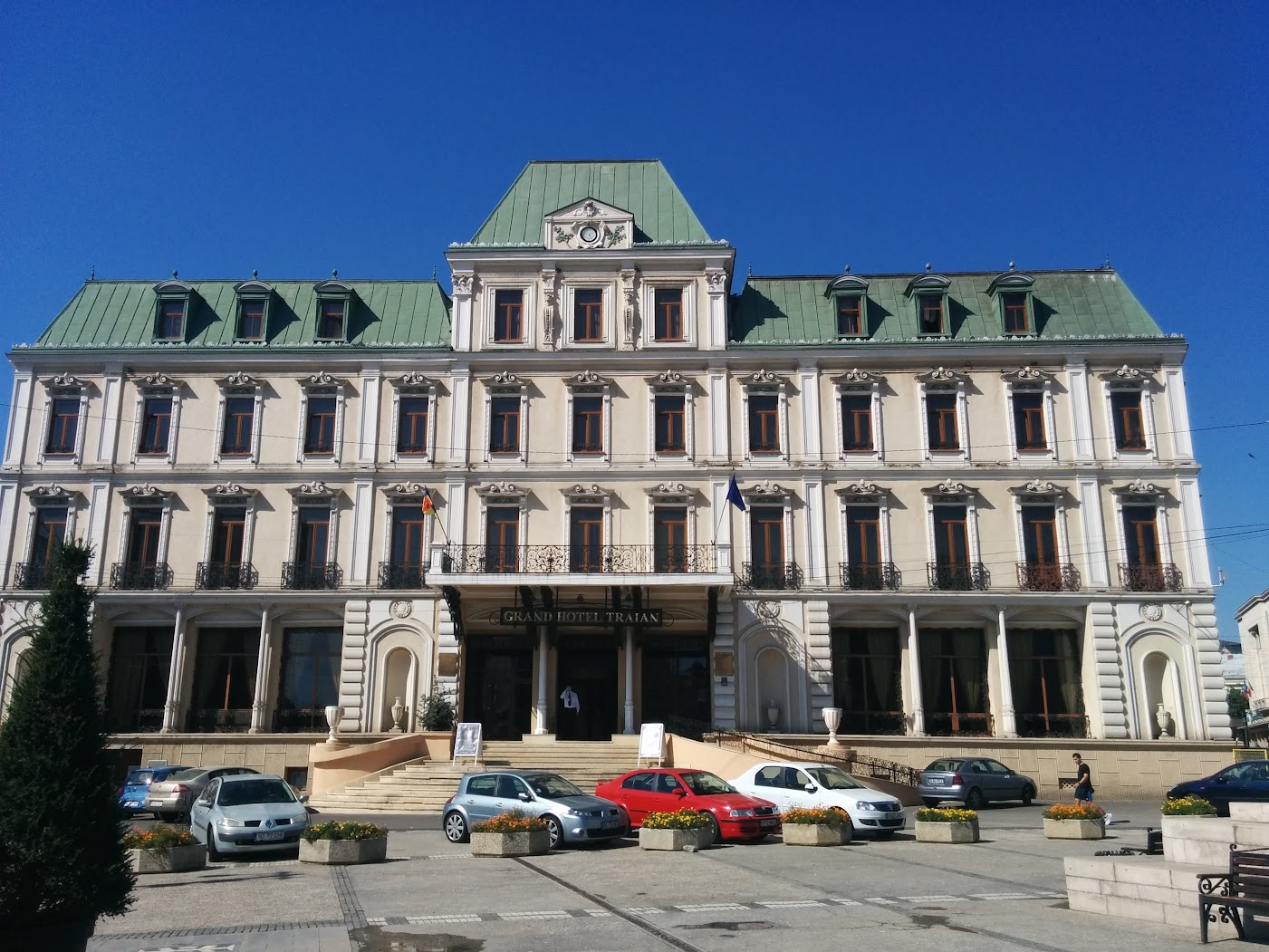
- Main hall in 2006
- Interactive map of the Grand Hotel Traian area

General information
- Architectural style: Neoclassicism
- Location: Piața Unirii nr. 1, Iași, Romania
- Completed: 1882
- Client: Scarlat Pastia

Technical details
- Structural system: Metallic frame

Design and construction
- Architect: Gustave Eiffel

Grand Hotel Traian, previously known as "Hotel Traian," is a hotel located in the city of Iași, situated at 1 Unirii Square. The building was constructed in 1882 according to the designs of the French engineer Gustave Eiffel (1832-1923). The hotel was included in the National Register of Historic Monuments in 2015.

== History ==
On the site where the Traian Hotel stands today, there were previously the shops of lawyer Scarlat Pastia (1827-1900), who served as the mayor of the city of Iași from 1877 to 1879. Despite the profitable businesses on Unirii Square and the streets of Arcu and Lăpușneanu, the mayor decided to demolish them to build a national theater. However, the theater project was not realized, and in its place, the Traian Hotel was erected.

Impressed by the quality of the Eiffel Bridge in Ungheni, Scarlat Pastia turned to the renowned French engineer Gustave Eiffel (the creator of iconic modern marvels such as the Eiffel Tower in Paris and the Statue of Liberty in New York) for the design of the building. The structure was built in the French neoclassical style, featuring a metal framework (a novelty at the time), with cast iron columns and metal platforms.

The construction work took place between 1879 and 1882 and was carried out by the firm led by Eiffel. Due to the very high construction expenses, Scarlat Pastia incurred substantial debts, leading to his financial ruin. To cover his debts, he had to transfer ownership of the property to the Urban Credit Society (one of his creditors). The new owner transformed the building into a hotel, which generated higher income than a theater would have.

Subsequently, the hotel came into the ownership of the Jewish Theitler family. Businessman Adolf Theitler died in 1930, leaving behind two children: Jacques (who died in 1941 without heirs) and Carol. In 1942, the property was expropriated from the heirs of Adolf Theitler. In 1943, the Iași City Hall renovated the hotel using its own funds. Hotel Traian was nationalized in 1950. After the Revolution, Hotel Traian was transferred to the ownership of "Turism Moldova" SA, a state-owned company.

In 2001, following the enactment of Law no. 10/2001, Israeli citizen Carol Theitler (born in Pașcani in 1924 and emigrated to Israel in the 1960s) claimed 36 nationalized properties, including Hotel Traian, Astoria, and Continental. He requested the restitution of the hotel in kind.

In 2001, over several months, businessman Dănuț Prisecariu, the owner of SC Alimentara SA, acquired the share packages held by SIF Transilvania, SIF Banat-Crișana, and SIF Moldova in SC "Turism Moldova" SA on the Rasdaq market. He thus purchased 10.65% of the share capital of SC "Turism Moldova" SA. In January 2002, a capital increase took place in which Prisecariu participated with 25.6 billion old lei, ultimately giving him ownership of 60.04% of the company's share capital. In March 2003, Prisecariu purchased through a public auction the package of 230,894 shares held by the Ministry of Tourism in SC "Turism Moldova" SA (representing 30.4% of the company's share capital). He became the owner of 90% of the share capital of the company, which included Hotel Traian.

== See also ==
- Eiffel Bridge
