= Grand Hotel, Qazvin =

Historic site in Qazvin, Iran

Coordinates: 36.26744°N 50.00267°E

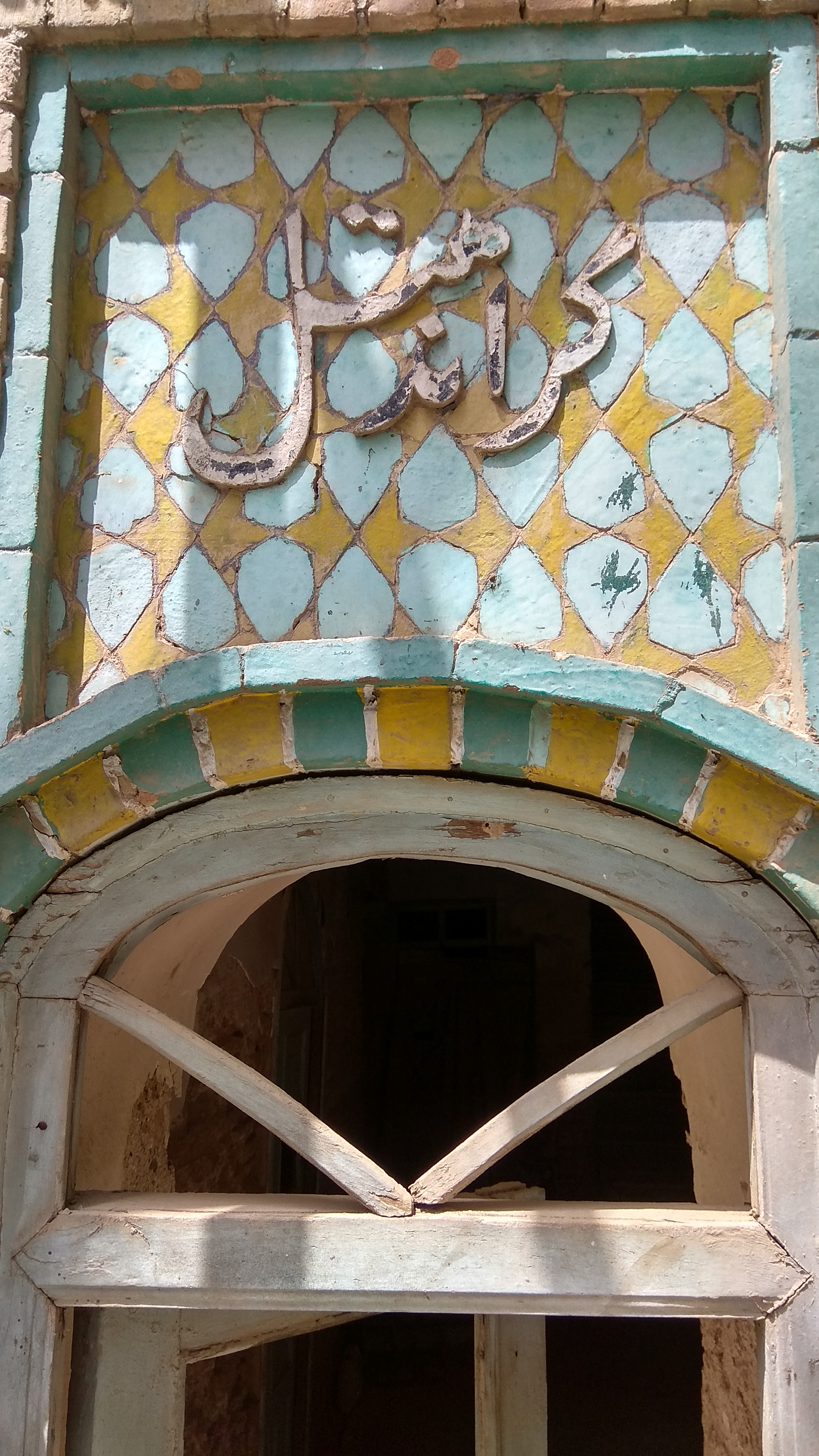
- Interactive map of the Grand Hotel, Qazvin area

General information
- Location: Qazvin, Iran
- Completed: 1922

The Grand Hotel, Qazvin (Persian: گراند هتل قزوین) was a Qajar era hotel built in 1922, and under the governorship of Sa'd as-Saltaneh, in Qazvin, Iran. It was built in the western wing of Chehel Sotun Palace, by the well-known architect of Qazvin, Ostad (Master) Ali July.

This building is one of the oldest remaining hotels in Iran. According to travelers who had personally resided in the hotel and based on itineraries, all the furniture and appliances of the hotel were European in style and the interior decorations were luxurious. Historically, Grand Hotel had been a place of political incidents such as Reza Shah’s coup d’etat plan.

== Gallery ==
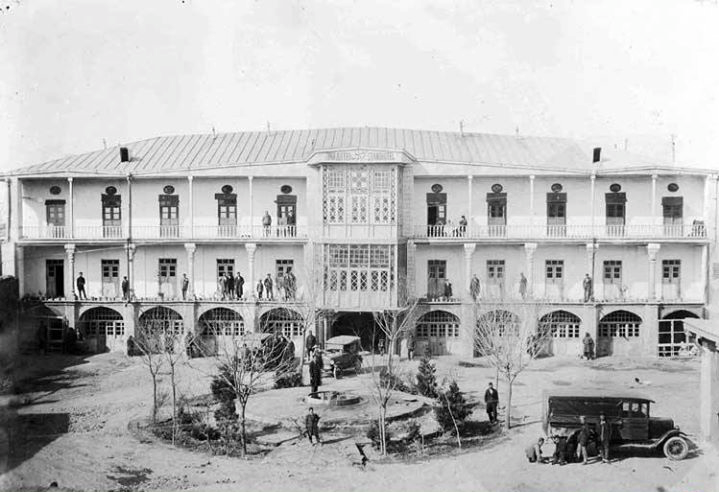
Old photograph of the Grand Hotel

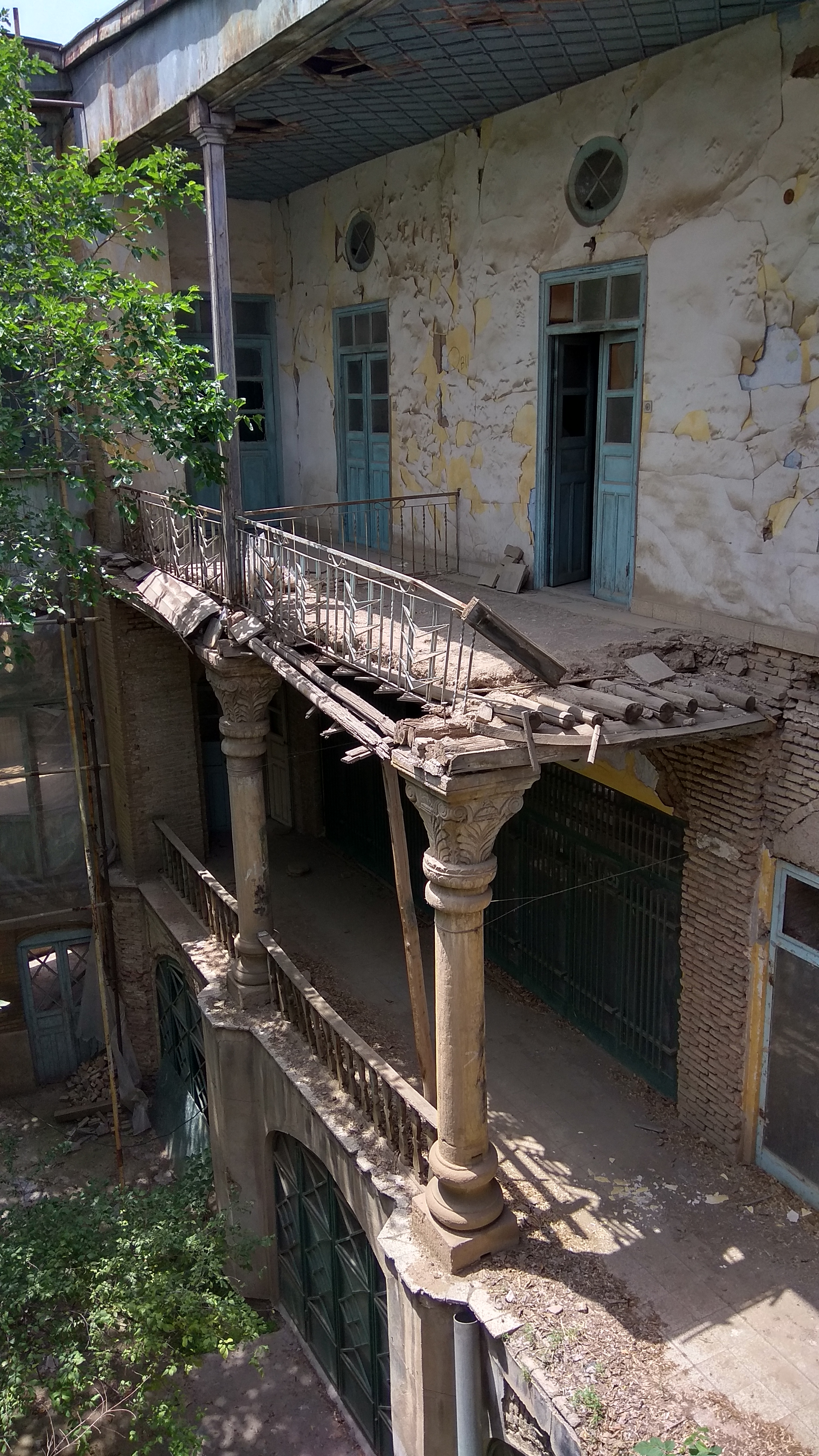

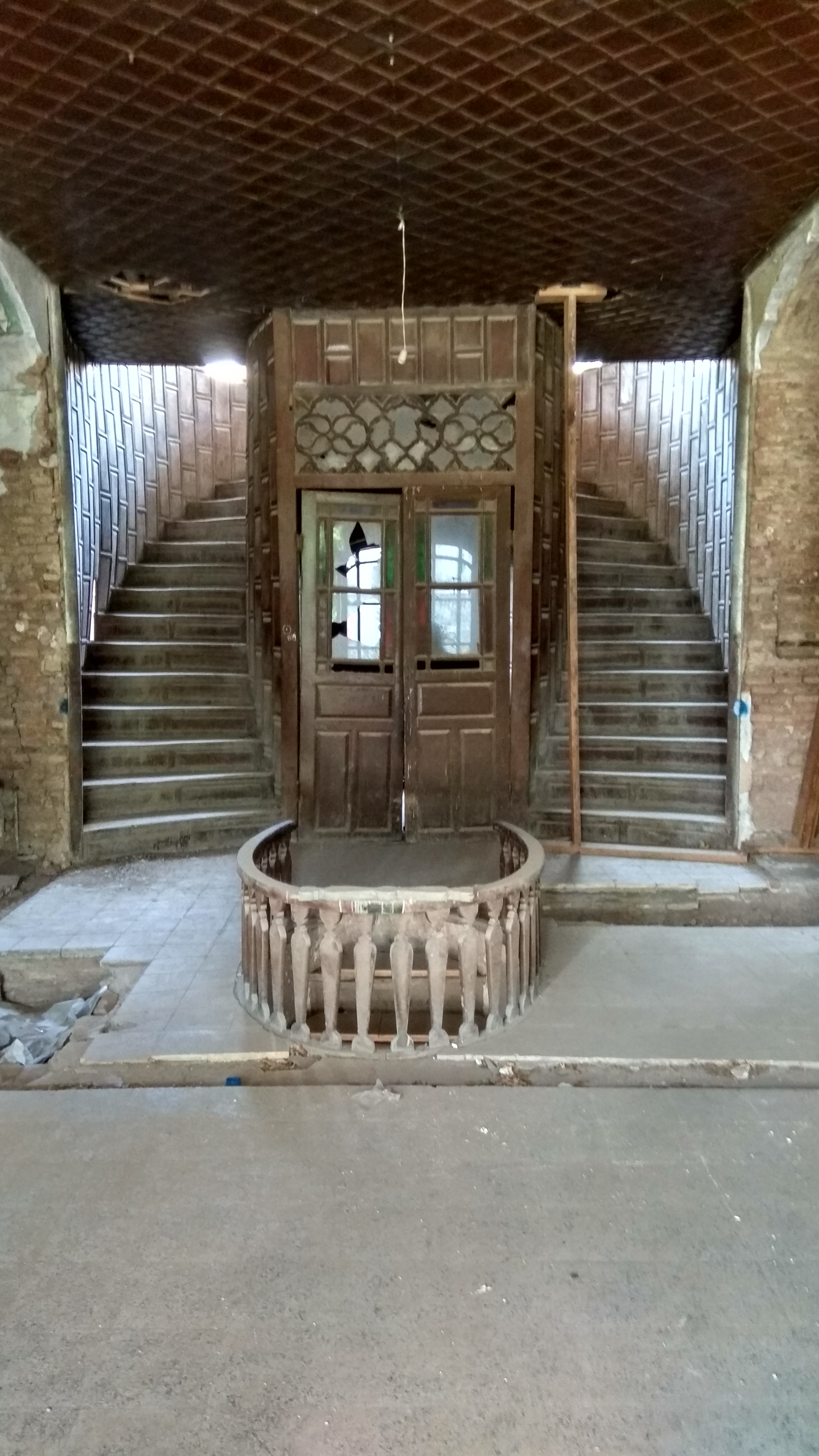

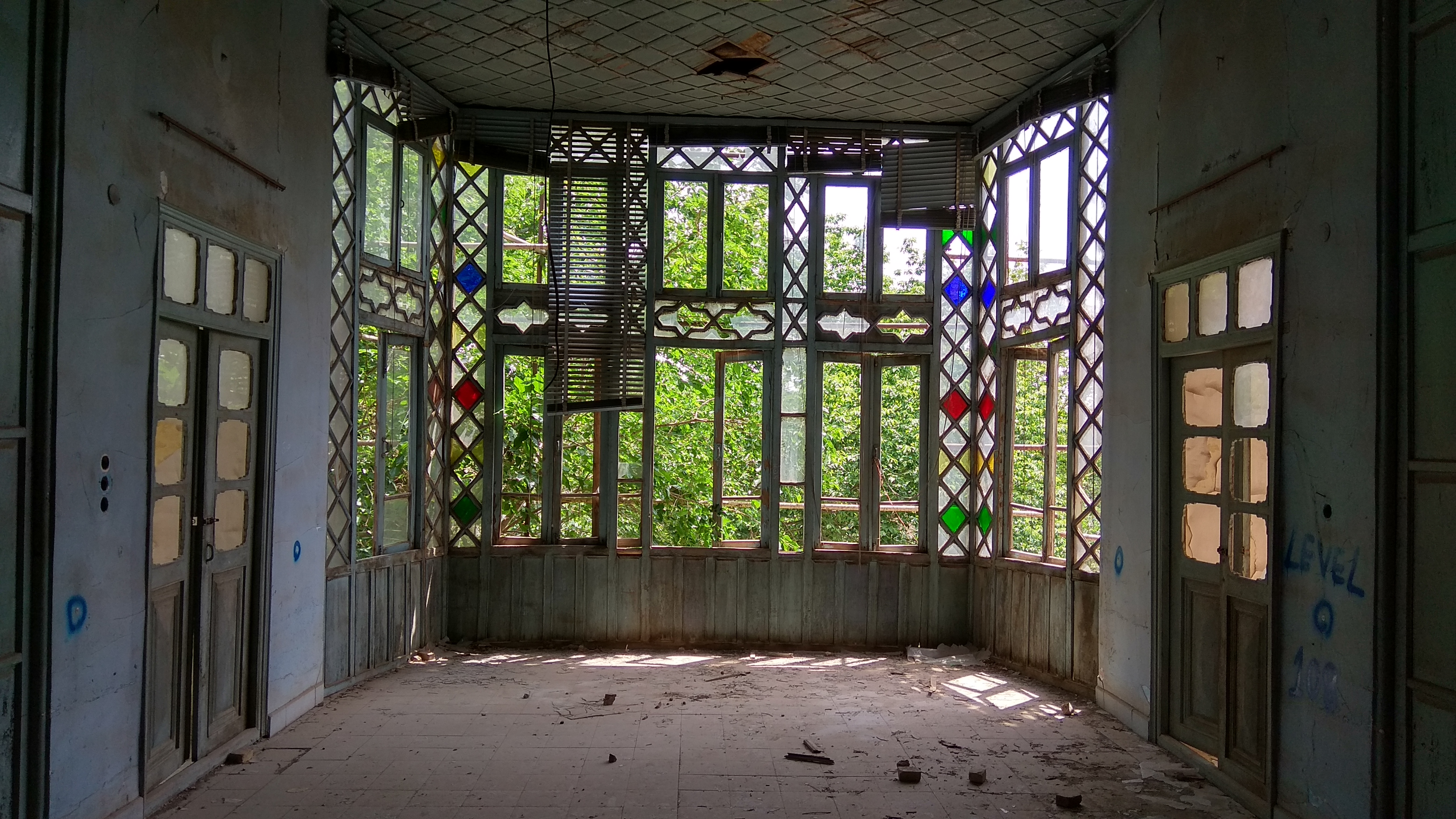

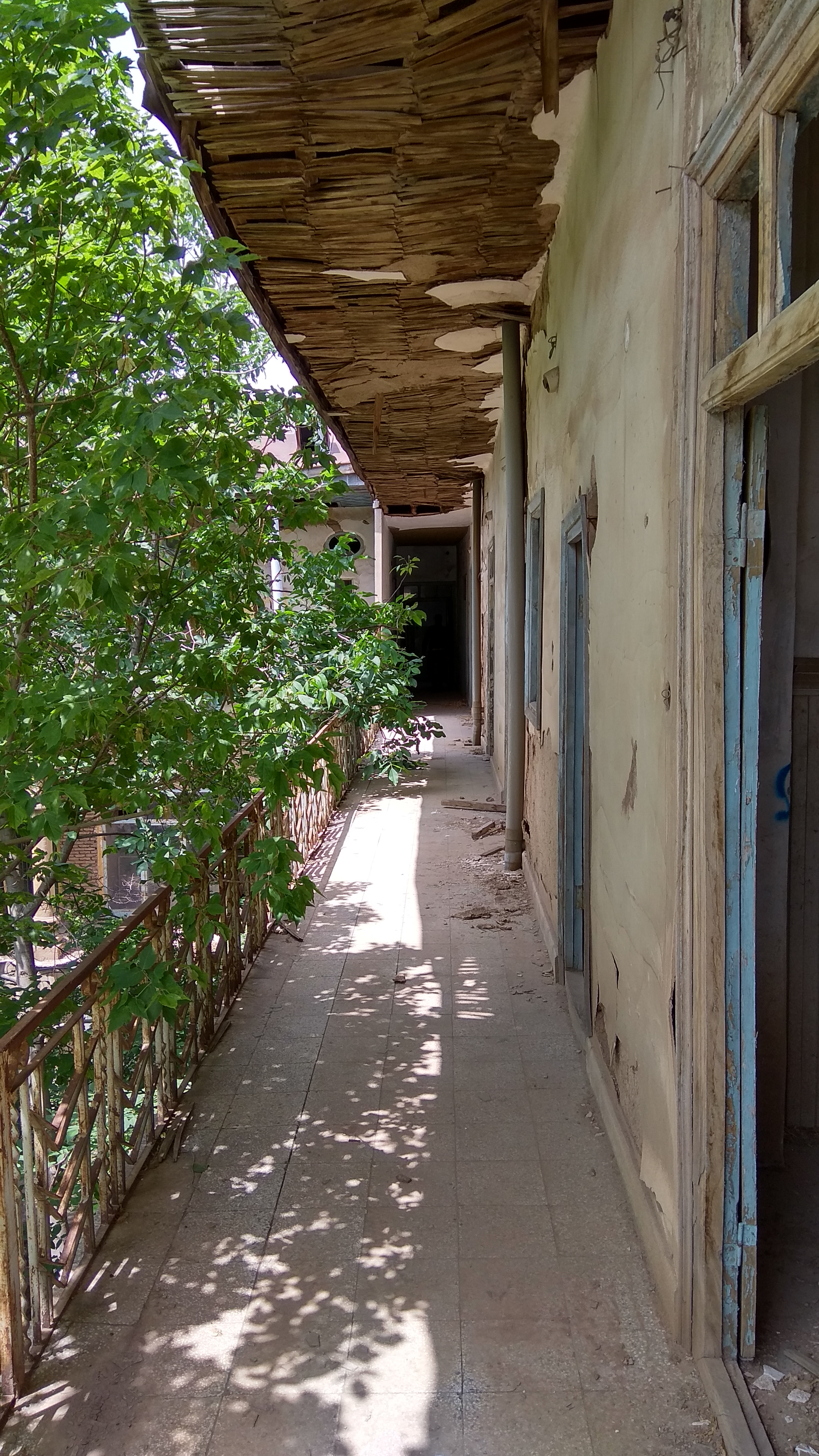
