= Grand Hotel (Rostov-on-Don) =

Hotel in Rostov-on-Don, Russia

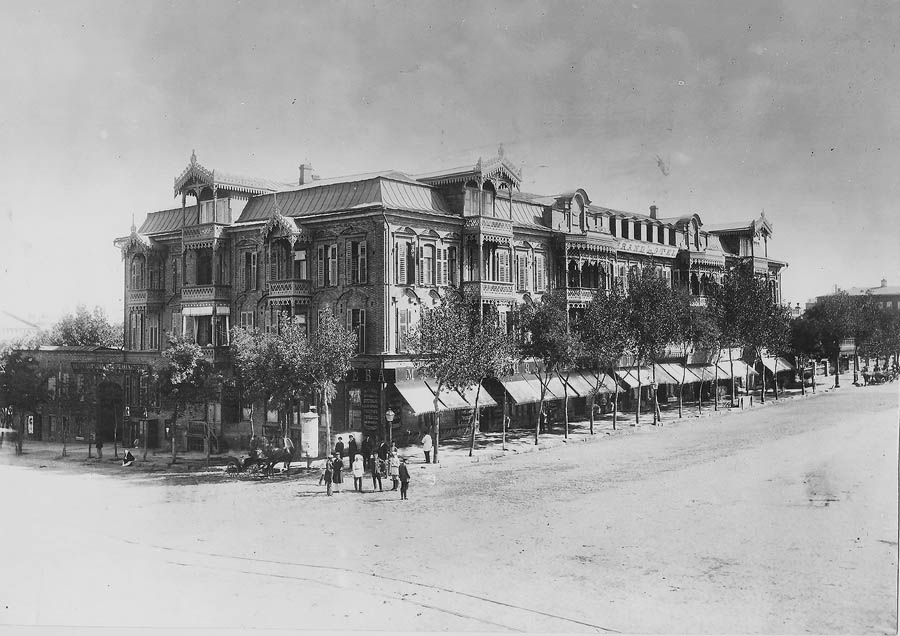
- Interactive map of the Grand Hotel area

General information
- Location: Rostov-on-Don
- Coordinates: 47.22°N 39.7077°E
- Opening: late XIX century
- Closed: 1911

Grand Hotel in Rostov-on-Don is a former hotel located in Rostov-on-Don (city and administrative center of Rostov oblast). It was burned down in 1911.

The building of the Grand Hotel (the Kuznetsov hotel, named after Nikolay Kuznetsov, its second owner) was built in the second half of the 19th century and was located in Rostov-on-Don at the northeast corner of the intersection of Bolshaya Sadovaya Street and Taganrog Avenue (now Budyonnovsky Prospekt). Levtunovsky was the first owner of the hotel.

The house had a garden, terraces, porches and galleries. The building was supplied with electricity. Also, there was a restaurant, a reading hall, public telephones, shower and baths in the house. In the shopping stalls, rows of the first floor placed some firms and workshops: Bakhsimyants' wine cellars, the Pavlovsky's shop, the haberdasher's, the jewelry shop "Paris Jeweler", a watch shop of Mark Miesirov. In 1904 the Taganrog District court registry rented accommodation in the building for circuit sessions. On the second and third floors there were 60 hotel rooms in the value of 1 ruble and more.

The criminal life of Rostov also took fancy to the hotel. Here there was Sophia Hoffmann, who was called «Sonka the Golden Hand» in Rostov. A woman entered a hotel's unlocked rooms and took away guest’s personal things. If she was noticed, she pretended to be a lost foreigner. Sophia Hoffmann was shot by the members of the Medic and Reiki gang in the 1920s. The Soviet scriptwriter and playwright Pogodin Nikolay Fyodorovich used prototype of Sophia Hoffmann in his play "The Aristocrats".

Since 16 March 1911 the firm "A. L. Shavgulidze and Co" has become the owner of the hotel. But on 11 July 1911 the building caught fire and the fire was extinguished for five days. The fire was so strong that the windows shattered in the house of Pustovoitov (the present Central Department Store) from the side of Bolshaya Sadovaya Street. The hotel was completely destroyed by fire. The Grand Hotel's story came to the end after this event.

During the Soviet time, a one-storied building was constructed on the side of hotel. In this house worked Trade Organization named The Unified Workers – and – Peasant's Cooperative Society (UCS).

In the thirties, the building (United workers 'and peasants' cooperative society) was demolished in order to build a multistorey apartment block here. However, the Great Patriotic War made adjustments. The construction started after the war in 1949. Currently, the four-storey building, built on the site of the Grand Hotel, is occupied by many shops.

== Literature ==
- Fima Giganet "the criminal Rostov – the thirties";
- The Article "Vanka- Medic, bandit king of Rostov-Papa" from the site http://rslovar.com;
- The article «Rostov united workers 'and peasants' cooperative society»from the website http://forum.fox-notes.ru;
- The article "the house of Pustovoitova " from the site www.rostovbereg.ru;
- The article "Half of Rostov was built by him!" from the site www.donvrem.dspl.ru;
- G. V. Esaulov, V. A. Chernitsyna "Architectural Chronicles of Rostov-on-Don»;
- L. I. Usacheva, " Rostov-on-Don in the past and present»;
