= Grand (magazine) =

Lifestyle magazine

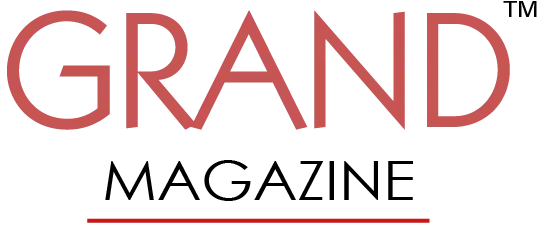
- Editorial director: Christine Crosby
- Categories: Lifestyle
- Frequency: Quarterly
- Publisher: GRAND Media, LLC
- Total circulation: 100,000 (2006)
- Founder: Christine Crosby; Jonathan Micocciin
- Founded: 2004
- First issue: October 2004
- Company: GRAND Media, LLC
- Country: United States
- Based in: Gulfport, Florida, U.S.
- Language: English
- Website: grandmagazine.com

Grand (stylized in all caps) is an American quarterly lifestyle magazine that publishes content related to grandparents and their families. It is based in Gulfport, Florida.

== History ==
Grand was founded in 2004 by Christine Crosby and her husband, Jonathan Micocci, after Crosby became a grandmother and could not find a magazine aimed at her new life stage. Crosby had previously founded Delta Business Systems, Inc. and later established Family Journal Publications. The first issue of Grand was published in October 2004, with Billy Crystal on the cover.

By 2006, Grand had reached a circulation of around 100,000 readers, roughly half of whom were paid subscribers.

In 2009, the magazine transitioned from print to a digital-only format.

== Grandparent of the Year ==
- Harrison Ford (2005)
- Tony Danza (2006)
- Naomi Judd (2007)
- Phil McGraw (2010)
- Martha Stewart (2012)
- Valerie Wood-Gaiger (2019)
