= Le Grand Henderson =

American writer and illustrator

Le Grand Henderson (1901–1964), most often writing under the nom de plume "Le Grand", was a writer and illustrator of books for all ages.

Le Grand was born in 1901 in Torrington, Connecticut. He attended the Yale School of Fine Arts for four years. After graduation, he headed for New York City. He found work designing heating and ventilating equipment, switchboards for submarines, and window and interior displays for Macy's and Bloomingdale's.

He soon tired of living in the city. He then went to St. Paul, Minnesota, where he began a yearlong journey on a houseboat down the Mississippi River to the Gulf of Mexico. The Augustus series of books takes place along the Mississippi, based on this trip down the river.

Le Grand is best known for his folklore series (9 books, including Cap'n Dow and the Hole in the Doughnut and Cats for Kansas) for children 4 - 8. The story of "Cap'n Dow and the Hole in the Doughnut" is said to have been written while he personally served as one of the crew of a down-East schooner off the coast of Maine, where men are sailors and doughnuts are doughnuts. He is also known for his Augustus series (12 books) depicting the country-wide adventures of a "Huck Finn"-type lad, for children 8 - 12. Overall, he wrote over 30 books between 1937 and his death in 1964.

== Works ==
- Why Is A Yak?, 1937
- Augustus and the River, 1939
- What About Willie?, 1939
- Glory Horn, 1941
- Augustus Goes South, 1940
- Augustus And The mountains, 1941
- Saturday For Samuel, 1941
- Augustus Helps the Navy, 1942
- Augustus Helps The Marines, 1943
- Augustus Helps the Army, 1943
- Augustus Flies, 1944
- Augustus Drives a Jeep, 1944
- Augustus Saves A Ship, 1945
- Augustus Hits The Road, 1946
- Cap'n Dow and the Hole in the Doughnut, 1946
- Augustus Rides The Border, 1947
- Augustus And The Desert, 1948
- Cats For Kansas, 1948
- Here Come The Perkinses, 1949
- The Puppy Who Chased The Sun, 1950
- The Boy Who Wanted to be a Fish,1951
- When the Mississippi Was Wild, 1952
- Home Is Up River, 1952
- Touch Me Not: A Novel, 1952
- Are Dogs Better Than Cats, 1953
- Tom Benn and Blackbeard, the pirate, 1954
- Why Cowboys Sing in Texas, 1950
- Matilda, 1956
- How Space Rockets Began (Scott, Foresman; Invitations to personal reading program), 1960
- Augustus Rides the Border, 1961
- How Basketball Began, (Scott, Foresman; Invitations to personal reading program), 1962
