= Awad Al Darmaki =

Emirati poet, lecturer and writer

- عوض الدرمكي
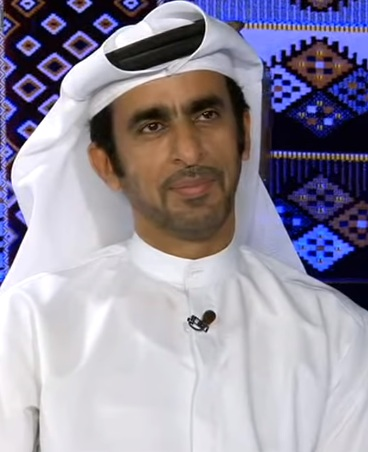
- Born: UAE
- Education: MA in Executive Leadership and Organizational Leadership
- Occupations: Poet, Writer and Lecturer
- Writing career
- Language: Arabic
- Website: twitter.com/awadaldarmaki?lang=ar

Awad Al Darmaki (Arabic: عوض الدرمكي) is an Emirati poet, lecturer and writer in the fields of strategic planning, human development and institutional development.

== Career ==
He obtained a master's degree in executive and organizational leadership in 2002 from the University of San Diego in the United States|United States, and a bachelor's degree in business administration from the United Arab Emirates University.

He served as an advisor to the chairman of the Board of Directors of the Department of Municipal Affairs and Transport in Abu Dhabi (2014-2018), executive director of Al Ain Club (2010), and Director General of Al Ain City Municipality (2007-2009). And Assistant Undersecretary for Administrative and Financial Affairs at Al Ain City Municipality (2005-2007).

He published books including: "Do not torture him," "Dinosaurs do not know how to drive a Cadillac," "San Diego Memories," and "The Oak Book", He was also a preparer and presenter for the "Fingerprints" program, part one and two, on Dubai TV. He also presenting "Our Islam is a Civilization" Program on Alshareka TV.

He is an opinion writer for Al-Ain News website, Al Bayan Newspaper, and "The Eighth Day" Newspaper.

== Books ==
Title	Language	Genre	Publisher	Year	Pages	ISBN	OCLC Number
Dinosaurs don't know how to drive a Cadillac	Arabic	Managing	The office for culture and information, Dubai	2015	171	978-602-00-9586-8	953963811
Do not abuse: the alienation of Ibn Zuraiq al-Baghdadi	Arabic	Novel	Safahat	2017	362		1081340127
Oh Memories of San Diego: Lessons, Memories, and Poetry from Exile	Arabic	Biography	The Office for Culture and Media	2014	332	978-9948-22-296-5	938651656
The Oaks	Arabic	Collection of Poems	The Office for Culture and Media, Dubai	2014	243	978-9948-20-969-0	1158714634
First Time Manager	Arabic	Managing	Abu Dhabi : The National Media Council	2019	207	978-9948-37-546-3	1112146526
On the covenant, oh Solaf	Arabic			2020			
Who threw the Sidr tree?	Arabic	Story		2019	70		

== Quotes ==
- "Whoever thinks that leaving one's home is an easy matter has gone far from the truth. Traveling for leisure and recreation is not like traveling to spend years for the sake of martyrdom. The first is pleasant and passes on the soul like the dewy breezes of magic, and the other is boring, almost holding the breath of the expatriate because of its weight and depression, and does not tell you like an expert!."
- "If you are one of those whom God has guided and luck smiled at him to be a manager, you will experience feelings of joy and will be met with feelings of fear and tension. You are not the only one who feels this. You will quickly pass through moments of joy, followed by the stage of (dilemma) if you will, and you are wondering where to start? How do I start? And what should a manager really do?."

== Poems ==
- There.
- The Oaks.
- My Eye Sight.
- I Bled Poem.

== See also ==
- Ali Al Reesh
- Ahlam Bsharat
- Hazim Abdallah Khedr
- Muhammad Aziz Arfaj
- Mohmaed Abid
