= Zreik =

Zreik, also Romanized as Zurayq, Zureik, Zureiq, or Zreiq is an Arabic surname (Arabic: زريق, زُرَيْق). Notable people with the surname include:

- Afaf Zurayk (born 1948), Lebanese multimedia artist and poet
- Ahmad Zreik (born 1990), Lebanese footballer
- Constantin Zureiq (1909–2000), Syrian intellectual
- Hisham Zreiq (born 1968), Palestinian-German filmmaker, poet, animator, musician and visual artist
- Maria Zreik (born 1991), Israeli Palestinian actress
- Stephany Zreik (born 1995), Miss Earth Venezuela 2020

== See also ==
- Ibn Zurayq
- Zureikat
