= Ahlam =

Ahlam (Arabic أحلام 'dreams') may refer to:

== People ==
- Ahlam (singer) or Ahlam Ali Al Shamsi (born 1969), Emirati singer
- Ahlam Bsharat (born 1975), Palestinian writer and poet
- Ahlam Khudr, Sudanese activist
- Ahlam Mosteghanemi (born 1953), Algerian writer
- Ahlam-Laila Nasr (born 2004), Swedish footballer
- Ahlam al-Nasr, Syrian Arabic poet
- Ahlam Shibli (born 1970), Palestinian photographer
- Ahlam Tamimi (born 1980), Jordanian woman who assisted the 2001 Sbarro restaurant suicide bombing
- Ahlam Youssef (born 1999), Egyptian karateka

== Places ==
- Ahlam, Iran, a village in Ahlamerestaq-e Shomali Rural District, Mazandaran Province, Iran

== See also ==
- Ahlamu, a Semitic semi-nomadic people
