= Abu Zurayq (disambiguation) =

Abu Zurayq is a cluster of archaeological sites in Israel.

Abu Zurayq or Abu Zureiq (Arabic: بو زريق) may also refer to:

- Abu Zurayq, Suwayda, village in Syria
- Imad Abu Zureiq, Syrian rebel leader

== See also ==
- Ibn Zurayq
