= The Book of the Superiority of Dogs over Many of Those Who Wear Clothes =

10th-century Arabic anthology praising dogs, by Ibn al-Marzubān

The Superiority of Dogs over Many of Those Who Wear Clothes
- Author: Ibn al-Marzubān
- Original title: كتاب فضل الكلاب على كثير ممن لبس الثياب; Kitāb Faḍl al-kilāb ʿalā kathīr mimman labisa al-thiyāb'
- Translator: G. Rex Smith and M. A. S. Abdel Haleem (English, 1978)
- Language: Arabic
- Subject: Dogs; loyalty and friendship
- Genre: adab anthology
- Publisher: Aris & Phillips (English edition)
- Publication date: Before 921 (the author's death)
- Publication place: Abbasid Caliphate (Baghdad)
- English publication date: 1978
- ISBN: 0-85668-090-7

The Book of the Superiority of Dogs over Many of Those Who Wear Clothes (Arabic: كتاب فضل الكلاب على كثير ممن لبس الثياب, romanized: Kitāb Faḍl al-kilāb ʿalā kathīr mimman labisa al-thiyāb) is a short Arabic anthology of anecdotes, sayings and verse in praise of the dog, compiled by the Baghdad man of letters Ibn al-Marzubān (died 309 AH / 921 CE). Serjeant described it as an adab collection of tales, and the English editors regard its compiler as mainly a collector of material drawn from earlier writers and from oral report.

The book has two unequal parts. The first laments the moral decline of people, and the second gathers stories of canine loyalty that are used to show that the dog is a more faithful friend than many humans. It includes hunting verse by poets such as Abu Nuwas, and its final story is a version of the legend of Gelert. Later writers such as al-Tanukhi and al-Damiri borrowed from it, and the Japanese scholar Tetsuo Nishio describes it as the longest treatise, among the medieval sources he surveys, on the theme of the role of dogs in human society.

The Arabic text was first printed in 1909 and again in 1922. It was edited and translated into English by G. R. Smith and M. A. S. Abdel Haleem in 1978, and translated into Japanese with critical notes by Nishio in 2022.

== Author ==
The compiler's full name was Abū Bakr Muḥammad ibn Khalaf ibn al-Marzubān ibn Bassām al-Baghdādī al-Muḥawwalī. The biographical dictionaries do not give his date of birth, but there is broad agreement that he died in 309/921. Louis Cheikho, who published the first printed edition in 1909, followed Haji Khalifa and cited Ibn Khallikan in giving his name as Abū Bakr ʿAlī ibn Aḥmad and his death date as 366/977. The later editors point out that this confuses him with a Shafiʿi jurist, and that Ibn Khallikan has no entry on Ibn al-Marzubān. His name contains the Persian-derived title marzubān ("governor of a frontier district"), and he is said to have translated more than fifty works from Persian into Arabic.

He is described in the sources as a historian, biographer, litterateur and poet. Apart from the Faḍl al-kilāb, only a few of his works survive, among them Dhamm al-thuqalāʾ ("Blame of disagreeable people") and al-Muntakhab min Kitāb al-hadāyā ("Selections from the book of gifts"). Titles attributed to him also include books on drink, drinking companions, love, and gardens and flowers, which suggest a preference for the anecdotal type of composition. The Faḍl al-kilāb is not among the works listed for him in the Fihrist of Ibn al-Nadim.

== Title ==
The title rhymes in Arabic (kilāb, "dogs", with thiyāb, "clothes"), a device that was fashionable at certain periods in Arabic literature. The editors argue that the rhyme is not merely ornamental, because a verse quoted in the book states that the people it criticises have human faces and wear clothes. They also note that faḍl can mean both "superiority" and "favour", so that the title can also suggest the favours that dogs do for people. The work also circulates as Tafḍīl al-kilāb, and Cheikho's edition calls it Faḍāʾil al-kilāb. Nishio considers Faḍl to be the more likely original form.

== Background ==
According to the English editors, the book grew out of a conversation between Ibn al-Marzubān and a friend in 10th-century Iraq. The friend remarked that sincere affection had disappeared, and asked him to collect what had been said about the superiority of the dog over unreliable friends. The editors suggest that the political and economic situation of the Abbasid Caliphate encouraged nostalgia for an earlier age of mutual trust, a feeling they trace back to the tribal values of the desert and to the Islamic ideal of the community as a single body.

== Contents ==
The work opens with a chain of transmission and the compiler's address to a friend who has complained that people no longer feel genuine affection for each other and that their morals have declined. Ibn al-Marzubān agrees and goes on to illustrate the point. The English editors supplied the titles of the two parts, "Man has gone to the dogs!" and "Man's best friend". They also suggest that Ibn al-Marzubān's own contribution was the title and the act of compilation, since he worked mainly as a collector of material.

=== Part one: "Man has gone to the dogs!" ===
The first part is a sequence of verses and sayings mourning the disappearance of trustworthy people. Many begin with the formula "Gone are those…", modelled on a line attributed to the early Arab poet Labid. Other poets quoted include Abu Tammam and Ibn al-Rumi. In their preface the editors quote Lord Byron's epitaph for his Newfoundland dog at Newstead Abbey, and note that phrases in it echo the early pages of the book.

=== Part two: "Man's best friend" ===
The second part opens with sayings on the loyalty of the dog attributed to the Prophet (the editors note that these are not found in the collections of sound hadith), to Umar and other early Muslims, and to later figures. It then gives a series of stories and poems, which the editors describe as following no recognisable order and as derived from an oral setting in which participants capped one story with another. The stories include:

- a dog that dies to save its king from a poisoned milk pudding, and is buried in a tomb between the graves of the king's parents;
- a dog that follows a party of pilgrims to Mecca and guards their baggage;
- a dog that fetches bread for a man left bound in a ravine, and then leads his son to him;
- a dog that carries messages tied around its neck, and others that stop a thief or attacker;
- several anecdotes in which a dog kills a friend who has betrayed its owner, together with the owner's unfaithful wife;
- an anecdote about a dog named Mismār, kept by the Prophet's wife Maymūna;
- a final story of a man who kills his dog after finding it bloodied, and then discovers that it had killed a snake threatening his infant son.

The reviewers note the editors' observation that the last story is, in slightly different dress, the same as the Welsh legend of Gelert, and that the tale seems to have originated in India. In a passage near the end, the text argues that the dog's merits outweigh its faults, and that jurists, judges and rulers have not forbidden the keeping of dogs.

== Language and style ==
The editors praise the line attributed to Labid with which the collection begins as concise and evocative, and note that later poets in the collection imitate it, though none matches it. Part two is written in simple, direct prose. The editors place it between the ornate style of the maqama and the folk narrative that mixes in colloquial Arabic, and compare it with narrative prose in modern Arabic. Much of the verse is anonymous, but Ibn al-Marzubān usually gives the chain of informants for each item.

== Themes ==
The central contrast is between the sincerity of the dog and the unreliability of people. In the opening part, verses complain that the people who are left look like people but prove not to be when tested, and that they have human faces and clothes on their bodies. In part two, the dog is praised for guarding the household whether the owner is present or absent, for being grateful for little, and for staying loyal even when it is treated harshly. Anecdotes show dogs that stay at their owners' graves until they die, guide lost travellers to camp by barking, and defend their masters against attackers.

Several stories apply the contrast directly to human conduct. In one, a poet writes that "human dogs" do more harm than real dogs because a real dog can be driven off. The collection also answers critics of dogs. For example, it replies to the objection that dogs are active at night, when thieves are about, by saying that this is why they wake their owners. D. W. Waters, in a review of the 1978 edition, wrote that the part on the dog as friend, which makes up most of the book, has both humour and pathos.

== Sources and later use ==
Ibn al-Marzubān usually names his authorities, but at least fifteen stories and statements in the Faḍl al-kilāb also appear in al-Jahiz's Book of Animals without any mention of him. The editors conclude from the style that Jāḥiẓ was the original author, and for the material that Ibn al-Marzubān attributes to al-Madāʾinī, which is also found in Jāḥiẓ, they suggest that doctrinal or personal rivalry may explain the omission. Nishio adds that Ibn al-Marzubān also used Persian, Indian and Greek material.

The work was in turn used by later writers. Al-Tanukhi used fourteen of its stories in his Nishwār al-muḥāḍara; al-Damiri quotes it in Ḥayāt al-ḥayawān al-kubrā, and from al-Damīrī it is known that Ibn al-Jawzi included the long story of the dog that saved a king's life in one of his works; and one of the stories appears in the One Thousand and One Nights, with a hawk as the hero in place of a dog. The modern writer ʿAbd al-Raḥmān Raʾfat al-Bāshā preferred to quote it in his book on hunting among the Arabs, although he knew Jāḥiẓ's work. Other medieval authors, such as al-Qazwini and al-Nuwayri, took their material on dogs directly from Jāḥiẓ.

== Transmission, manuscripts and editions ==
=== Transmission ===
The text opens with a chain of authorities running from Ibn al-Marzubān to Ibn Ḥayyawayh al-Khazzāz (295–382/907–992), who reported it in a session dated Wednesday 11 Rajab 381 (23 September 991). Later chains pass through al-Tanūkhī and several jurists and judges. Nishio divides the manuscripts into two families, which he calls α and β, according to the length of the chain, and argues that the α family, which includes copies made in the 19th century, may preserve an older form of the text.

=== Manuscripts ===
Smith and Abdel Haleem worked from photocopies of three manuscripts, in Cairo, Berlin and Paris, together with two printed texts. Nishio, using manuscripts that have since become available, lists at least ten:

Library	Shelfmark	Date
al-Azhar library, Cairo	Abāẓa 6369 (no. 202)	991 AH / 1583
Berlin State Library	Wetzstein II 1730 (Ahlwardt 5425), ff. 38r–51v	copied 1048 AH / 1638, with an addition of 1167 AH / 1753
al-Azhar library, Cairo	Abāẓa 6369 (no. 164)	1308 AH / 1890
Dār al-Kutub, Cairo	no. 4241	1340 AH / 1922
Bibliothèque nationale de France	Arabe 6011, ff. 1r–23r	c. 18th century
Beinecke Rare Book and Manuscript Library, Yale	Landberg MSS 350	c. 19th century
Dār al-Kutub, Cairo	no. 252 (majāmīʿ)	c. 19th century
Dār al-Kutub, Cairo	no. 7418	19th–20th century
St Petersburg State University library	Ms. O. 911	1883 (?)
Dār al-Kutub, Cairo	Taymūr 391	undated

Nishio notes that the existence and date of the first al-Azhar manuscript are known only from Smith and Abdel Haleem, and that he could not confirm Dār al-Kutub nos. 4241 and 7418 in the library's catalogue.

=== Editions ===
- Louis Cheikho, in the Beirut journal al-Machriq 12 (1909), pp. 515–533, based on a manuscript dated 649/1251. Smith and Abdel Haleem criticised it for replacing passages on sexual matters with euphemisms without comment.
- Ibrāhīm Yūsuf, Cairo: Maṭbaʿat Maḥmūd Tawfīq, 1341 AH / 1922, which does not name its manuscript source.
- G. R. Smith and M. A. S. Abdel Haleem, The Book of the Superiority of Dogs over Many of Those Who Wear Clothes, Warminster: Aris & Phillips, 1978. This is a critical edition of the Arabic text with an English translation, using the 1922 Cairo print as its basis, and is illustrated with sketches by Kathryn Witt, calligraphy by Aḥmad Muṣṭafā, and plates from manuscripts.
- ʿIṣām Muḥammad Shabārū, Beirut: Dār al-Taḍāmun, 1992, and later Arabic editions by Saʿīd al-Shinnārī (c. 2006) and Muḥammad ʿAbdullāh Qāsim (Damascus: Dār al-Bashāʾir, 2019, published under the combined title al-Thuqalāʾ wa-faḍl al-kilāb).

== Reception and scholarship ==
The English edition was reviewed in 1979 in, among other journals, the Journal of the Royal Asiatic Society and the Bulletin of the School of Oriental and African Studies. D. W. Waters wrote in the Journal of the Royal Asiatic Society that the book was aimed at the general reader as well as the Arabist, and praised it as rewarding "as literature, as history, and as a social document". R. B. Serjeant, in the Bulletin of the School of Oriental and African Studies, called it evidence that Arabic scholarship need not be dull, and described the Arabic text as well edited and generously vowelled; he considered the edition a novel contribution to a theme little discussed by Arabic scholars.

Later scholars have both used and criticised the edition. Nishio quotes the historian Alan Mikhail, who described the work as an overview of tenth-century Islamic views of dogs. Nishio criticises Smith and Abdel Haleem for not using the Yale (Landberg) and St Petersburg manuscripts, for not identifying the two textual families, for editorial choices that he considers inconsistent and often arbitrary, and for rearranging some anecdotes in the English version relative to the Arabic. In a 2025 article in the Iranian journal Arabic Prose Studies, Movahedi reads the work as a satirical and allegorical critique of hypocrites, pretentious ascetics and ostentatious jurists, and situates it within the tradition of Islamic allegorical literature.

== See also ==
- Kitab al-Hayawan
- Dogs in Islam
- Adab
- Gelert
- Saluki
- Animals in Islam
