= Contemporary Najd Poets (book) =

1960 book

Contemporary Poets of Najd
- Author: Abdullah bin Idris
- Original title: شعراء نجد المعاصرون
- Language: Arabic
- Subject: Literary criticism
- Genre: Non-fiction
- Publication date: 1960
- Publication place: Saudi Arabia
- Media type: Print
- Pages: 304
- ISBN: 9960621251

The book Contemporary Poets of Najd (Arabic: شعراء نجد المعاصرون) is a critical work by the Saudi poet and critic Abdullah bin Idris. In it, he chronicles poetry in the Najd region following the establishment of the Kingdom of Saudi Arabia. The first edition was published in 1960 (1380 AH).

Ibn Idris began preparing his book in 1958 (1378 AH) after reading works about literature in the Hejaz, such as Poets of the Hejaz in the Modern Era by Abdul Salam Tahir Al-Sassi, and The Story of Literature in the Hijaz by Abdullah Abdul-Jabbar.

== Literary value ==
The value of the book Contemporary Poets of Najd lies in its focus on the experiences of poets in a specific geographical area that was largely neglected culturally. This neglect was attributed to the scarcity of journalistic publications dedicated to literary and creative movements, with the exception of the weekly newspaper Al-Yamamah (by Sheikh Hamad Al-Jasser), the monthly magazine Al-Jazeera (by Sheikh Abdullah bin Khamis), and the newspaper Al-Qassim. The dominant content in these publications was social articles with a political bent, except for Al-Jazeera, which focused significantly on literature from a conservative, classical perspective that aligned with the views of its editor, who was averse to modern literary renewal. The book is considered a seminal work that provided a foundation for a modern historical approach to contemporary literature. It was followed by numerous other studies and remains a landmark in the history of literature in central Saudi Arabia.

== See also ==
- Saudi literature
