= Ibn Zurayq =

Ibn Zurayq or Ibn Zuraiq may refer to:

- Ibn Zuraiq al-Baghdadi (died 1029), poet active in al-Andalus
- Yahya ibn Ali al-Tanukhi (born 1051), Syrian historian

== See also ==
- Abu Zurayq
