= Harmah =

Harmah حَرْمَة
- City
- Location within Saudi Arabia
- Coordinates: 25°55′34″N 45°20′01″E
- Country: Saudi Arabia
- Province: Riyadh Province

Government
  - Chairman: Saud Bin Abdulaziz Almadi

Population (2013)
  - Total: 13,000
- Time zone: UTC+3 (AST)
  - Summer (DST): UTC+3 (AST)
- Postal code: 11952

Harmah (Arabic: حَرْمَة) is a city in Riyadh Province, Saudi Arabia, chaired by Mr. Saud Bin Abdulaziz Almadi. It is considered one of the most important historical cities in Najd. It is located 211 kilometres (131 mi) by road northwest of Riyadh, next to the city of Al Majma'ah and within Al Majma'ah governorate. At the 2011 census it had a population of 9,011 people.

== City districts ==
- Al Shamaly (Arabic: الحي الشمالي) or * Al Madhi (Arabic: حي الماضي)
- Ar Rawdah (Arabic: الروضة)
- Al Busairah (Arabic: البصيرة)

== Climate ==
Being in the middle of the Arabian desert, Harmah experiences extremely hot summers and relatively cool winters. Humidity is low though throughout the year. The minimum temperature in the summer ranges between 35 and 42 °C (95 and 108 °F).

== Notable people ==
- Abdullah bin Idris (1929–2021), author and poet

== See also ==
- List of cities and towns in Saudi Arabia
- Regions of Saudi Arabia
