= Ma'na an-Nakba =

1948 book by Constantin Zureiq

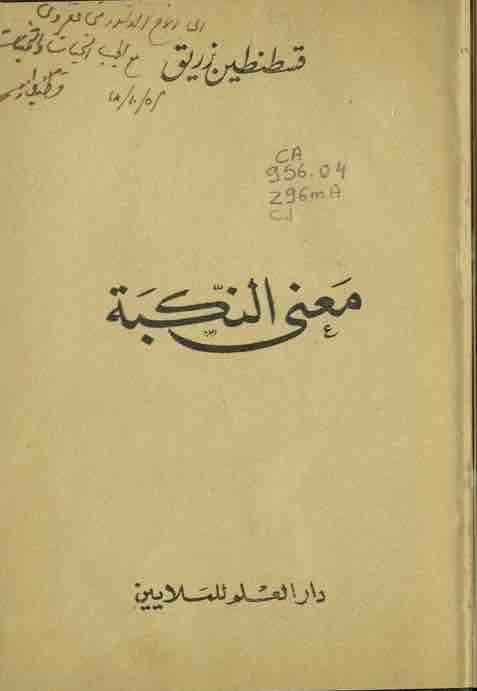
- Author: Constantin Zureiq
- Original title: معنى النكبة
- Language: Arabic
- Publisher: Dar al-Ilm lil-Malayeen

Ma'na al-Nakba (Arabic: معنى النكبة), transl. The Meaning of the Catastrophe, is an anti-Zionist and pan-Arabic book by Constantin Zureiq published by Dar al-Ilm lil-Malayeen in Beirut in 1948. The book defines the conceptual parameters of the Arab tragedy, which Zureiq terms al-Nakba, to describe the Arab defeat in the War of 1948 (also known as the Palestine War). It was the first of many works by Arab intellectuals to analyse the reasons behind the Nakba. Many have claimed that the book took great courage to write, as intellectual freedom was challenging at the time.

== History ==
The book was written during a ceasefire of the 1948 Palestine war and sold out that summer. It was re-printed in October that year due to high demand. Zureiq became one of the first to describe the developments of the war and to use the term Nakba (النكبة 'disaster' or 'catastrophe').

== Summary ==
The book draws a broad outline of the 1948 war. Zureiq goes on to discuss the history leading to the defeat of the 1948 war and its greater consequences for Arab nationalism, stating that seven Arab nations failed the task of "suppressing Zionism" and lost "a considerable portion of the land of Palestine." He describes Zionism as a determined and influential enemy, meticulously prepared for prolonged struggle, claiming that Zionists possess significant scientific and financial capabilities with multiple international allegiances.

Zureiq progresses to discuss the causes of the catastrophe, establishing that the Arab nations are responsible for their ill-preparedness for battle, their disunity, and their underestimation of the strength of their enemy. He goes on to address the need to accept responsibility for the defeat and learn from the mistakes, warning to not place blame on the Jews, the British, the Americans, the Russians, or the United Nations. The book contains several observations that Zureiq warns could lead to an even greater disaster if the causes for the war aren’t addressed.

== Translation ==
It was translated as The Meaning of the Disaster by R. Bayly Winder, published 1956 in Beirut (Khayat).
