= Al-Tanukhi =

Al-Tanukhi is a nisba, and may refer to:

- Sahnun or Sa'id al-Tanukhi, 9th century qadi
- Mansur ibn Abd al-Rahman al-Tanukhi, 9th century Abbasid governor of Yemen
- Yahya ibn Ali al-Tanukhi (1051–1105), Syrian chronicler
- Al-Sayyid al-Tanukhi, 15th century Druze theologian
