= Tahir Zamakhshari =

Saudi poet and writer (1914–1987)

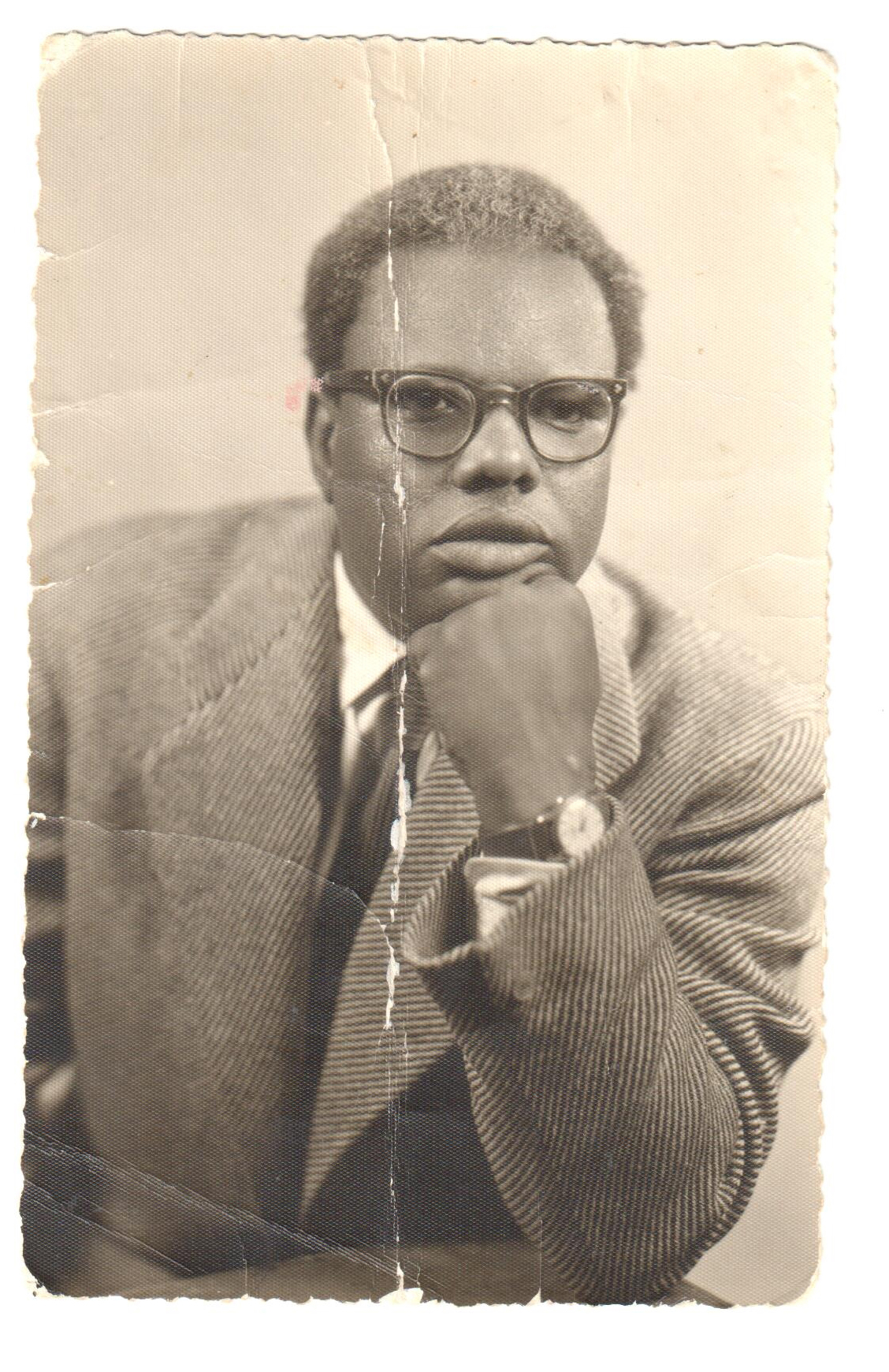
- Born: 1914 Mecca, Saudi Arabia
- Died: 1987 (aged 72–73) Mecca
- Occupation: Journalist, writer, poet
- Language: Arabic

Taher Abdul Rahman Zamakhshari (Arabic: طاهر زمخشري) is a contemporary Saudi poet and writer. He was born in Makkah Al-Mukarramah on Rajab 27, 1332 AH - June 22, 1914 AD and died in 1407 AH - 1987 AD. He is one of the prominent figures in the field of literature, especially in poetry in the Kingdom of Saudi Arabia, and the Hejaz region in particular. He is considered one of the first generation that established a creative movement in Saudi Arabia, whether in the literary or media fields. He was an Afro-Saudi.

He began his educational life in the "Kitab al-Nuri" of Sheikh Suleiman Nuri and his father, Sheikh Abdul Muti Ibrahim al-Nuri in al-Bab district then joined the Al-Falah School in Makkah, where he completed his education in 1929. He worked since 1931 in government jobs until he settled in the Radio House, during which he accomplished many works, the most important of which was contributing to the establishment of the first municipality in Riyadh and the Saudi Radio.

He was known by the title (Baba Taher) for his interest in children's literature. He presented a radio program called (Children's Corner) and founded the first Saudi children's magazine, Al-Rawda magazine. Its first issue was on September 17, 1959, AD, but it did not last long and stopped after 27 issues on May 12, 1960, AD. He was the owner of the first published poetry book in the history of modern Saudi poetry, which is the Diwan of Dreams of Spring, issued in 1946 AD.

Al-Zamakhshari lived a life of exile and lived for a long time in Egypt, then moved to Tunisia, where the Tunisian government honored him and awarded him two medals in 1963 AD and 1973 AD. He was also awarded the Saudi State Appreciation Prize in Literature for the year 1404 AH - 1984 AD, which was received in a ceremony held on 08/08/140 AH - 04/28/1985 AD in the King Faisal Conference Hall in Riyadh under the patronage of King Fahd bin Abdulaziz Al Saud.

He issued 30 poetry books, including the Diwan of Music of Al Ashjan (1976) and The Green Horizon (1970 AD) and the Rubaiyat of Saba Najd (1973 AD). He married from his social circle in Makkah, Amna Bana, and they had four children (three daughters and one son). His wife died while they were in their prime, and he never married after that.

He had a friendship relationship with many Arab writers, poets and artists, most notably the poet Prince Abdullah Al-Faisal, Muhammad Saeed Khoja, Mohammed Suroor Sabban, Abbas Youssef Qattan, Mahmoud Saleh Qattan, Abdullah bin Omar Belkhair, Ahmed bin Abdul Ghafour Attar, Abdul Maqsoud Muhammad Saeed Khoja, Abbas Faeq Ghazzawi, Ahmed Rami, Farouk Jweida, Tunisian TV director Moncef Makshar, musician Tariq Abdel Hakim, Omar Kadres, artist Talal Maddah and Muhammad Abdo and journalist writer Abdullah Omar Khayat, who said about Zamakhshari, "One of the famous poets who believed and did good deeds when he was known. He was known for his widows, intelligence and circumstance until the great professor Muhammad Hussein Zaidan - may God have mercy on them - said about him: "Al-Zamakhshari is the poet of the writers, and the gentle of poets". He died on Shawwal 02, 1407 AH - May 29, 1987 AD in the city of Jeddah and was buried in his hometown of Makkah Al-Mukarramah in the Ma'ala Cemetery.

== Career ==
He began his working life at the age of eighteen by moving between several governmental and non-governmental jobs in the period from 1349 AH to 1389 AH, starting with:

- Temporarily employed in the Soul Census Committee - 1349 AH / 1930 AD.
- A teacher in the orphanage in Medina, which later became the House of Social Education - 1350 AH / 1931 AD.
- Writer and proofreader at the Amiri Press "The Governmental Press" and "Umm Al-Qura Newspaper" located in Harat Ajyad in Makkah Al-Mukarramah 1351 AH / 1932 AD.
- Secretary of the Administrative Council of the Capital Municipality in Makkah Al-Mukarramah with Sheikh Abbas Qattan, who nominated him to Sheikh Mahmoud Saleh Qattan to work as Secretary of the Riyadh Municipality in the year "1361 AH / 1942 AD", and he was among the founders of the Riyadh Municipality, then the Municipality of Al-Kharj and Al-Laith.
- Secretary of the Customs Office at the Ministry of Finance (1367 AH / 1948 AD).
- A writer on the radio during its establishment (1368 AH / 1949 AD), then a broadcaster and program presenter, then a general observer of programs on the radio.
- Editor-in-chief of Al-Bilad.

The curtain came down on his career in the year 1389 AH / 1969 AD by referring him to early retirement, following an absence that lasted for three years for treatment in Egypt. Then he stopped working permanently and devoted himself to literature and poetry until the end of his life.

== Media career ==
He contributed to the establishment of the Saudi Radio since its first inception in Jeddah by Royal Decree No. 7/3/16/3996 dated 09/23/1368 AH, and worked for it as a broadcaster, preparer and observer, and presented more than (18) radio and television programmes, the most famous of which was his program (Children's Corner) which gave him the nickname (Baba Taher), and one of his brightest stars was the child Jamil Mahmoud, who later became one of the most prominent Saudi musicians and artists. He also founded the first musical group in the Kingdom of Saudi Arabia that contributed to presenting national anthems and music on the radio, consisting of Muhammad Ali Bostaji, Dr. Suleiman Shabana, Said Shawli, Hamza Maghribi, Al-Harasani and Abdul Majeed Al-Hindi, and with the encouragement of King Fahd bin Abdulaziz Al Saud, issued the first specialized color magazine for children in the Kingdom of Saudi Arabia, Al-Rawda magazine, which was issued in 1959 AD. Al-Zamakhshari headed the Saudi newspaper Al-Bilad for one year.

From his radio programs:

- Family Program
- Kids Corner Program
- New Day
- Short Stories
- With the Original
- Poetry and Music
- Evening Newspaper
- window on the moon
- Ramadan words
- Evening Kindergarten

From his TV shows:

- The Prayer of Night
- From the Guidance of Prophecy
- O Lord

== Poetry ==
He inclined to literature and poetry since his childhood, influenced by the poet Ahmed Ibrahim Al-Ghazawi, head of the Sharia court in which his father worked, and by the judge Sheikh Orabi bin Muhammad bin Saleh Sijini, who encouraged him to public readings, which opened a wider field for science and knowledge. His poetic brilliance appeared at the age of fifteen when he was in the seventh grade at Al-Falah School. Then he imitated Al-Rafi'i, as well as Al-Mutanabi, Shawqi and others, and collected all these oppositions in a group under the title "Inspired by the Night", which is his first poetic experiences. In 1350 AH / 1931 AD, his literary production began with the "Festival Bulletin" in 1366 AH / 1946 AD and was published through the Culture Library in Makkah Al-Mukarramah. Diwan of poetry printed in the history of the Kingdom of Saudi Arabia, Diwan Dreams of Spring.

His poetic purposes varied between religious, national, social, romantic and political. He composed some poetic plays, and some of his poems were translated by UNESCO into English, French, and German languages. He was one of the first to write vertical poetry in the Saudi press, starting with a poem published by him in Al-Bilad newspaper on the eighth of Ramadan 1365 AH, the fifth of August 1946 AD.

His poetry has become the subject of many studies, including academic and non-academic, in Saudi universities, and some Arab universities, including King Abdul Aziz University, Umm Al-Qura University, Cairo University, University of Khartoum, and UNESCO institutes. One of the first students of his literature and poetry was Dr. Abd al-Rahman al-Tayyib al-Ansari, who prepared a master's thesis at Cairo University entitled "The Phenomenon of Escape in the Songs of the Desert by the poet Taher Zamakhshari" in 1960 AD 1380 AH.

== Lyric poetry ==
Taher Zamakhshari is one of the pioneers in writing the lyric text in Saudi Arabia, and the number of his songs has reached nearly 200 songs, ranging from religious, patriotic, emotional and monologues.

His beginning was with writing the lyrical text in Al-Majsat poetry (a kind of money art in Makkah Al-Mukarramah that sings at weddings and occasions).

Among his most famous songs:

Religious
Song	Composer	Singer
My God	Saeed Abokhashbah	Saeed Abokhashbah Mohammed Abdo
The Believing Soul	Morsy Al-Hariry	Mohamed Alfayomy
My Lord	Abbas Albeledy	Abbas Albeledy
Labaek Lord of the worlds	Hasan Ghandour	Maha Aljabery
Allah is Greater	Rashed Al-Sheikh	Maha Aljabery

National
Song	Composer	Singer
Almarutin	Tarek Abdulhakeem	Tarek Abdulhakeem
My Country	Alaa Kamel	Maha Aljabery
Oh sweetest love	Omar Kardas	Mohammed Abdo
Oh my joy, my joy / Yesterday at sunset	Abdulghany Alsheekh	Abbas Albeledy

Emotional and others
Song	Composer	Singer
Faster than Boeng	Gazi Ali	Hanaa Alsafi
Brown Sweety	Gazi Ali	Talal Madah
The whispering Najwa	(Ebtesam Lotfy)	Ebtesam Lotfy
Bedouin	Tarek Abdulhakeem	Aaeda bo Khrees
Jeeb Algool Ala Alraeek	Tahir Zamakhshari	Heyam Yunes
My love, you burn me	Omar Kardas	Mohammed Abdo
The Bird Told Me	Baleegh Hamdy	Gazi Ali
Teach Me	Talal Madah	Talal Madah
If You Ask Me	Omar Kardas	Omar Kardas Ebtesam Lotfy Abdulmajeed Abullah
We Did Not Know	Omar Kardas	Mohammed Abdo

== Awards and honors ==
Taher Zamakhshari received a number of awards and honors, including:

- Medal of Independence of the third degree from the Republic of Tunisia in 1963.
- The Order of Culture of the second degree from the Republic of Tunisia in 1973.
- The State Appreciation Award for Literature in 1404 AH from the Kingdom of Saudi Arabia.
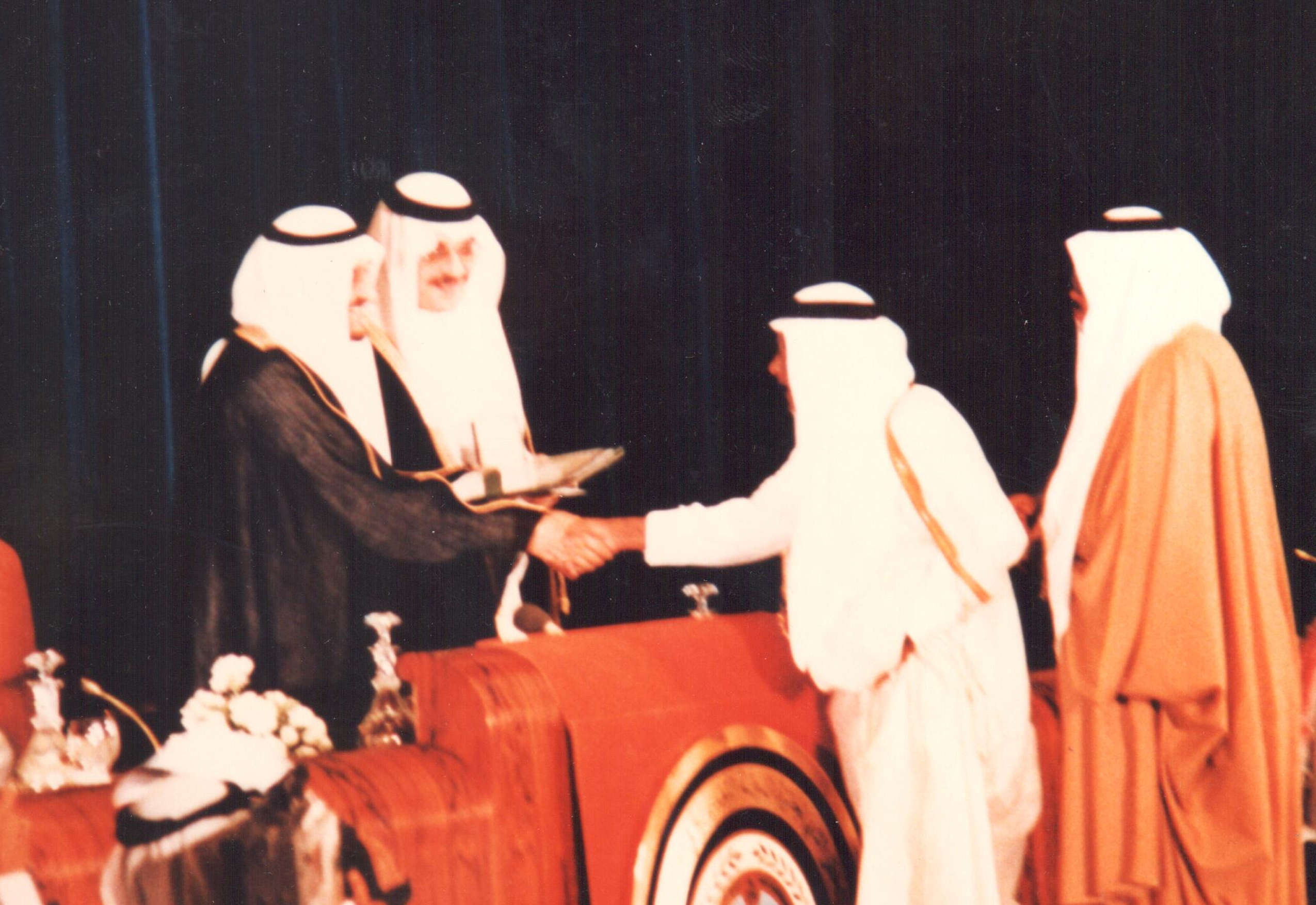
  Receiving the State Appreciation Award for Literature - Taher Zamakhshari.
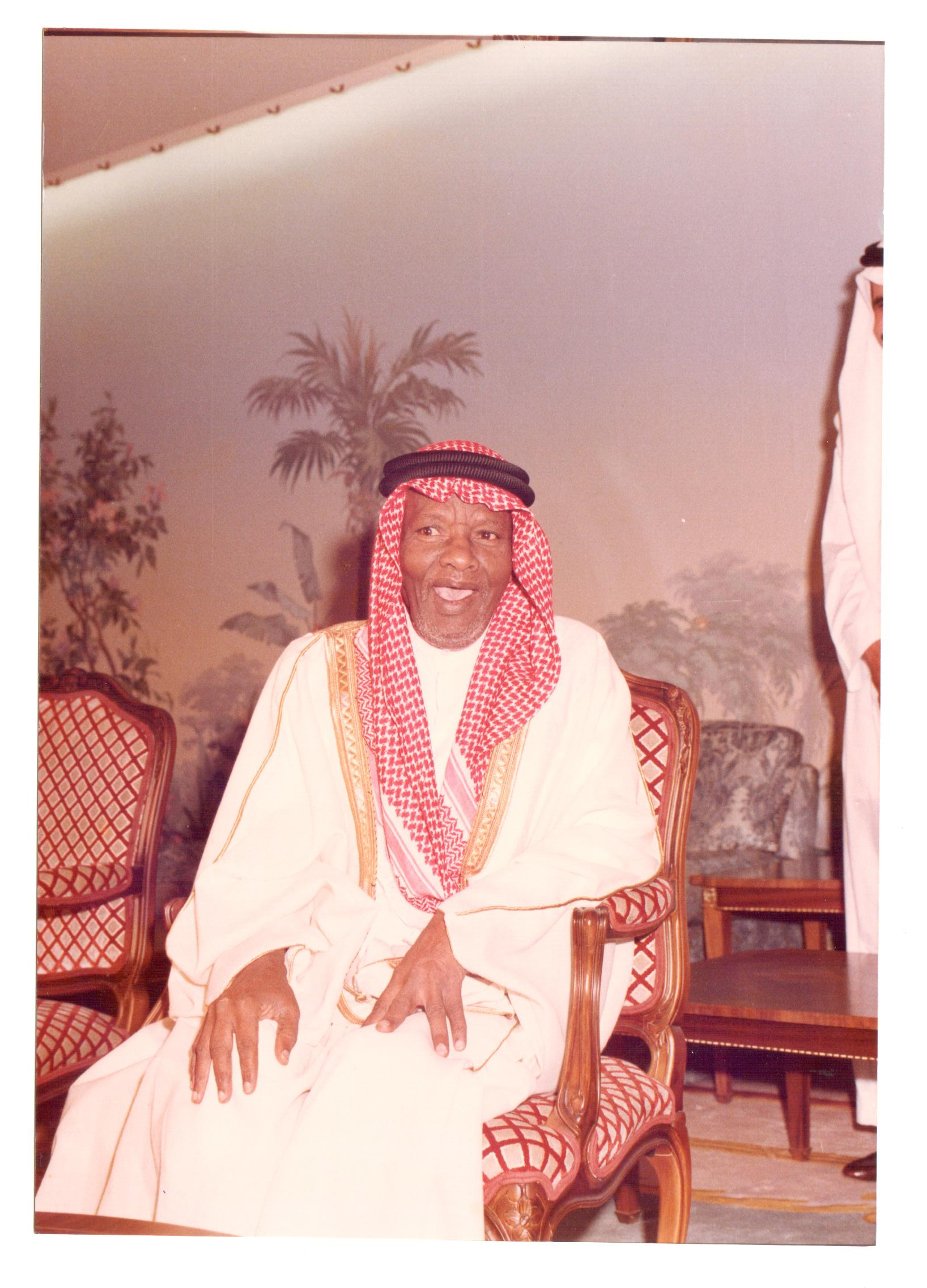
  A single portrait of the writer Taher Zamakhshari - State Appreciation Award for Literature 1405 AH-1985AD.

== Works ==
Divans

- "The Nile Collection" 1404 AH / 1984 AD: It is a group of books that he issued in Egypt.
1. «Dreams of Spring» 1946 AD / 1366 AH. It was the first diwan (it is said to be the first printed Saudi divan).
2. "Whispers" 1952AD / 1372AH.
3. "The Breath of Spring" 1955AD / 1375AH.
4. "Desert Songs" 1958 AD / 1378 AH.
5. ''On the Banks'', 1961 AD / 1381 AH.
6. "The Return of the Stranger" 1963 AD / 1383 AH.
- "The Green Collection" 1402 AH / 1982 AD: It is a group of collections that he issued in Tunisia.
1. "A Window on the Moon" 1399 AH, 1978.
2. "The Green Horizon" 1970 AD / 1390 AH.
3. «The Flying Sail» 1974 AD / 1394 AH.
4. "Ma'azif Al-Ashgan" 1976AD / 1396AH.
5. "The Memories Bag" 1977 AD / 1397 AH.
6. "Abeer Al-Zikriyat", 2nd Edition, 1980 AD / 1400 AH.

He also has:

1. "Echoes of Rabiya" 1957AD / 1377AH.
2. "Expatriated tunes" 1963 AD / 1383 AH.
3. "My Beloved on the Moon", 1st Edition, 1969AD/1389AH, 2nd Edition, 1985AD/1405AH.
4. ''Labbaik'' 1968AD / 1388AH.
5. "Min Al-Khayyam", 1st edition 1969AD/1389AH, 1985AD/1405AH.
6. ''Rubaiyat Saba Najd'', 1, 1973 AD / 1393 AH, 2nd Edition, 1980 AD / 1400 AH.
7. ''Jeddah, Bride of the Red Sea'', 1407, 1987 AD.
8. "Wreck guitar".
9. "Green Quartets".
10. "The Guitar of Oblivion".

Other literary works

1. ''On the Road'', 1962 AD / 1382 AH.
2. ''Al-Ain Bahr'' - Research on what poets organized in Al-Ain 1389 A.H., 1969 A.D.
3. ''On the margins of life'' - stories.
4. ''With Al-Aseel'' 1399 AH, 1979 AD - Reflections and psychological studies.
5. "to her".
6. "Radio songs".
7. ''Nights of Ibn al-Rumi'' - Study 1368, 1949.
8. ''Scattered sayings''.
9. "dreams".
10. ''And Ramadan Kareem''.
11. "The Crying of Cast".
12. "Flower Leaves".

== Achievements ==
- Contributed to the establishment of the first municipality for the capital of the Kingdom of Saudi Arabia, Riyadh, under a supreme order from King Abdul Aziz Al Saud on 16/08/1361 AH - 27/08/1942 AD.
- Issuance of the first book of poetry printed in the Kingdom of Saudi Arabia "Dreams of Spring 1946 AD".
- Prepared and presented the first children's program in the Kingdom of Saudi Arabia "Kids Corner".
- He supervised the first transfer of Friday prayers from the Grand Mosque and the Prophet's Mosque, and the transfer of Hajj rituals in Arafat and Mina.
- The first sports commentator and writer in the Kingdom of Saudi Arabia, signed by "Retired Employee".
- He founded the first band for Saudi Radio.
- He issued the first specialized magazine directed to children, "Al-Rawda" in 1959.
- The first Saudi writer and poet to be honored outside the Kingdom of Saudi Arabia by Tunisian President Habib Bourguiba.
- The most prolific Saudi poets in poetic production with 30 books.

== Written about him ==
Research and studies

- Poetry of Taher Zamakhshari - Master's Thesis - Maryam Saud Bubshit, 1408 AH - 1988 AD.
- Elements of Formation in the Romantic Poem A Study in the Zamakhshari Nile Group - MA - Asmaa Musaed Ibrahim Al-Omari 1420 AH - 1999 AD.
- The metaphorical image in the poetry of Taher Zamakhshari - Master's thesis - Ghada Abdel Aziz Damanhouri 1422 AH - 2002 AD.
- The poetic image of Taher Zamakhshari - a master's thesis - a technical objective study - Dr. Fatima Mastoor Al-Masoudi - 1424 AH - 2004 AD.
- The Place in the Poetry of Taher Al-Zamakhshari - Master's Thesis - Salma Muhammad Bahshwan 1430 AH - 2009 AD.
- Social Poetry of Taher Zamakhshari: An Objective Technical Study - MA - Hussein bin Mubarak Al-Saedi 1431 AH - 2010 AD.
- The Natural Environment in the Poetry of Taher Zamakhshari - Master's Thesis - Afra bint Othman Al-Hassoun 1435 - 2014 AD.
- Binary indications in the poetry of Taher Zamakhshari - MA - Rania Abdel Hamid Hamdan Al-Rifai 1436 AH - 2015 AD.
- Quartets in the poetry of Taher Zamakhshari - a technical objective study - MA Al-Mujtaba bin Ali Muhammad Ahmed 1437 - 2016.
- The Woman in the Poetry of Taher Zamakhshari - A Supplementary Research to the Master's Thesis in Literature and Criticism - Moaid Attia Al-Qarni - 1437 AH - 2016 AD.
- Color in the poetry of Taher Zamakhshari - an artistic semantic study (the Nile and Al-Khadra groups as a model) - Master's thesis - Reem Abdullah Al-Harbi 1438 AH - 2017.
- Color in the poetry of Taher Zamakhshari - MA - Muzna bint Muhammad al-Bati 1439 AH - 2018 AD.
- Romance and its manifestations in the poetry of Taher Zamakhshari - MA - Manal Dowayan Ayed Al-Hajouri 1439 AH - 2018 AD.
- The semiotics of alienation and alienation in the "Nile" and "Khadra" groups, according to the Saudi poet Taher Zamakhshari - Ph.D. - Muhammad bin Hamid Al-Shamri 1441 AH - 2020 AD.

Books

- The Phenomenon of Escape in the Songs of the Desert by the poet Taher Zamakhshari - book - Abdul Rahman Al-Tayyib Al-Ansari 1960 AD 1380 AH.
- Taher Zamakhshari His Life and Poetry - Book - Dr. Abdullah Abdul Khaliq Mustafa 1402 AH - 1981 AD.
- Manifestations in the Poetry of Taher Zamakhshari - Book - Prof. Abdullah Ahmed Baqazi - 1408 AH - 1988 AD.
- The Brown Diamond.. Baba Taher Zamakhshar The Twentieth Century - Part 1 - Book - Muhammad Tawfiq Blue 1426 AH - 2005 AD.
- Inspiration and originality in the poetry of Taher Zamakhshari 1914-1987 - book - study by Maryam Saud Abdul Aziz Bu Bashit 1435 AH - 2013 AD.
- The writer Taher Zamakhshari in brief - book - Muhammad Tawfiq Blue - 1440 AH - 2018 AD.

Articles

- Al-Zamakhshari: The Restriction of Poetry and the Word - Article by Fathi Rabie Al-Dweik - Al-Manhal Magazine: 1408 AH - 1988 AD.
- Taher Zamakhshari - Bibliographical documentation of his effects and what was written about him - Amin Suleiman Seydou - 1425 - 2004 AD.
- Taher Zamakhshari, poet, journalist and radio broadcaster - article - Abdul Rahman Al-Shubaili - Arabs 1438 AH - 2017.

== See also ==
- Muhammad ibn Ahmad al-Aqili
- Abdullah bin Khamis
- Muhammad Aziz Arfaj
