= Muhammad Obaid =

Emirati poet, academic and writer (born 1967)

Mohmaed Abid
- Native name: أحمد محمد عبيد
- Born: 1967 (age 58–59) Dibba, Sharjah, United Arab Emirates
- Occupation: Poet, writer, researcher, historian
- Language: Arabic
- Education: BA in Arabic Language (UAE University); MA in Arabic (Ain Shams University)
- Notable awards: Sharjah Prize for Arabic Poetry

Website
- twitter.com/ahmed_m_obaid?lang=ar

Ahmed Muhammad Ali Obaid Al-Handasi (Arabic: أحمد محمد عبيد) is an Emirati writer, poet, historian and literary academic. He was born in Dibba, Sharjah in 1967. He studied Arabic literature at the United Arab Emirates University and graduated with a degree in Arabic in 1988. Then he joined Ain Shams University in Cairo, where he obtained a master's degree. He worked as a secondary school teacher, then as an assistant teacher at the UAE University. He has many poetry collections and literary works. He was distinguished for his research on pre-Islamic and pre-Islamic Arabic poetry.

== Biography ==
Ahmed Muhammad Ali Obaid Al-Hindasi was born in 1387 AH / 1967 AD in Dibba, in the Arab Emirate of Sharjah. He obtained a BA in Arabic Language and Literature from the UAE University in 1988, and after his master's thesis at Ain Shams University in Cairo. He worked as a teacher for two years from 1988 to 1990, then was appointed as an assistant teacher at the UAE University in 1990. He is a member of the Emirates Writers Union, the Culture and Science Symposium, and the World Islamic Literature Association. As a cultural planner, he worked on several cultural projects such as the National Project for Documenting the Emirates Dialects, the National Project for Documenting the Heritage of the Emirates, the National Project for Documenting Geographical Names, the Ahmed Obaid Cultural Initiative, and the Encyclopedia of Emirati Authors, Investigators and Translators.

== Awards ==
- October 26, 2010: Sharjah International Book Fair Award for the best Emirati book by an Emirati author for his book titled “Ka’ab Bin Ma’dan Al Ashqari.”
- 2016: Sharjah Prize for Arabic Poetry, sixth session.

== Writings ==
=== Poetry collections ===
Title	Language	Publisher	Year	Pages	ISBN	OCLC Number
With The Night.	Arabic		1993	129		4770029840
Candles and Lanterns.	Arabic		1990	71		4771332397
From the songs of the old lover.	Arabic	Emirates Writers Union.	1998	87		4770935467
Lover in the time of exile.	Arabic		1995	128		4770916868
What the wind did not carry.	Arabic	Department of Culture and Information, Government of Sharjah.	2016	103	ISBN 9789948135722, 9948135725	968690176
Nawwar.	Arabic	Abu Dhabi Authority for Culture and Heritage, Cultural Foundation	2010	58	ISBN 9789948016311, 9948016319	743298902
Boyhood and Youth.	Arabic	Sharjah, United Arab Emirates: Department of Culture and Information.	2012	64	ISBN 9789948048688, 9948048687	843954840
Whispers on the doorstep of the soul.	Arabic	Al-Bayan Foundation for Printing Publishing	2007	60		144341503
words To her: artistic prose.	Arabic		2012	112		939397940
Vibrant Visions.	Arabic		2005	60	ISBN 9789948856108, 9948856104	67226464
Passing butterflies.	Arabic	Sharjah, United Arab Emirates: Department of Culture and Information.	2015	136	ISBN 9789948021155, 9948021150	936203638
Leftover Words.	Arabic		2002	68		60412005
Remaining Moments.	Arabic	Ministry of Culture, Youth and Community Development :Abu Dhabi	2013	46	ISBN 9789948071266, 9948071263	1176281626
Behind The Shadows.	Arabic	Ministry of Culture, Youth and Community Development :Abu Dhabi	2014	47	ISBN 9789948229292, 9948229290	1123193201
The last of the caravans.	Arabic		2004	69	ISBN 9789948856108, 9948856104	70689305

=== Stories ===
Title	Language	Publisher	Year	Pages	OCLC Number
Prisoner of mirrors.	Arabic	Dar Laila for publishing and distribution	2007	110	227280972
Five more minutesز	Arabic		2011		

=== Books ===
Title	Language	Publisher	Year	Pages	ISBN	OCLC Number
The problems of the UAE society in the stories of Muhammad Al-Murr.	Arabic	Sharjah, United Arab Emirates: Gulf House for Press, Printing and Publishing	1998	67		4770933434
Dictionary of Arab idols.	Arabic		2000	96		4770933319
Scouts of Contemporary Emirati Literature 1954–1999.	Arabic	Abu Dhabi: Cultural Foundation	2000			4770053804
Scouts of Contemporary Emirati Literature 1954–2001.	Arabic	Abu Dhabi: Cultural Foundation	2002			4770053819
In Arabic sources: Studies and investigations.	Arabic	Abu Dhabi: Cultural Foundation	2000	185		4770047129
Contemporary Emirati poetry: introductions and studies.	Arabic	Abu Dhabi: Dar Al-Fajr.	2001	177		4770566741
Studies in the Emirates’ literature, culture and dialects.	Arabic		2003			4770566746
The dialects of the Emirates: introductions and studies.	Arabic	Sharjah, United Arab Emirates: Department of Culture and Information.	2006			4771364696
The Arabian Gulf in the pre-Islamic era.	Arabic	Abu Dhabi: Cultural Foundation	2002	110		4770993159
Studies in ancient Arabic poetry.	Arabic	Abu Dhabi: Cultural Foundation	2001			4771251180
Who was called a poetry verse in pre-Islamic and Islam era.	Arabic	Abu Dhabi: Cultural Foundation	2001	79		4770267952
Places from the Emirates in Arabic sources.	Arabic	Al Ain, United Arab Emirates: Zayed Center for Heritage and History	2001	53		4770047357
Studies in ancient Arabic poetry.	Arabic	Beirut: Al-intishar Alarabi.	2001	163		4770958701
Islamic and pre-Islamic poets.	Arabic	Sharjah, United Arab Emirates: Department of Culture and Information.	2005	237	ISBN 9789948042334, 9948042336	4771337038
Two Choices or Choices of Al-Mofaddal and Al-Asma'i for the Al-Khafsh Al-Sagheer.	Arabic		2019			9494671054
Writing in the flaws of the Arabs until the end of the third century AH.	Arabic	The Journal of the College of Islamic & Arabic Studies.	2000			9494605242
Palm trees in the Hijaz in the Islamic and pre-Islamic era.	Arabic	Sharjah Heritage Institute.	2016	177	ISBN 9789948096207, 9948096207	1038380556
The historical origins of place names in the UAE.	Arabic	Sharjah Heritage Institute.	2016	87	ISBN 9789948096214, 9948096215	1019845918
The strangeness of Arab news in pre-Islamic times and Islam.	Arabic	Sharjah, United Arab Emirates: Department of Culture and Information.	2009	108	ISBN 9789948045908, 9948045904	914361906
Pre-Islamic poets.	Arabic	Abu Dhabi: Cultural Foundation.	2001	193		48556036
The poetry of Azd in the pre-Islamic era: the poetry of those who did not collect their poetry from among the poets of Azd.	Arabic	Abu Dhabi Tourism and Culture Authority.	2016	324	ISBN 9789948022374, 9948022378	1023434924
Studies in the Emirates’ literature, culture and dialects.	Arabic		2004	205		1148850267
Our cultural life and other articles.	Arabic					1103821361
Al Shanfari Al-Azdi's Poetry.	Arabic	Abu Dhabi: Cultural Foundation.	2000	200	ISBN 9789948232469, 9948232461	1148833689
The first stroke: thoughts and feelings.	Arabic		2004	70		67226532
Studies in the dialects of the Emirates.	Arabic	Ministry of Culture, Youth and Community Development :Abu Dhabi	2015	134	ISBN 9789948021926, 9948021924	965754370
The palm tree in the Emirates: a historical, linguistic, and historical introduction.	Arabic	Ministry of Culture, Youth and Community Development :Abu Dhabi	2015	90	ISBN 9789948021940, 9948021940	956530538
Scouts of Contemporary Emirati Literature, 1954–2004.	Arabic		2005	139	ISBN 9789948856139, 9948856139	67226389
Oman's poets in the pre-Islamic era and early Islam.	Arabic	Abu Dhabi: Cultural Foundation.	2000	104		45041993
The Pre-Islamic Era and its Literature in the Lost, Manuscript and Printed Sources of the Arab Heritage.	Arabic	Abu Dhabi: Cultural Foundation.	2000	138		756158179
The phenomenon of substitution in the dialects of the United Arab Emirates.	Arabic	Abu Dhabi Tourism and Culture Authority.	2013	258	ISBN 9789948171928, 9948171926	897646730
Cultural concerns and other articles.	Arabic		2004	201		67226373
The poetry of the Kalb tribe until the end of the Umayyad period.	Arabic	Abu Dhabi: Cultural Foundation.	1999	550		45053576
Emirates Literary Dictionary.	Arabic	Ministry of Culture and Knowledge Development: UAE	2016	199	ISBN 9789948027010, 9948027019	973653185
Scouts of Contemporary Emirati Literature, 1954–2012.	Arabic	Ministry of Culture, Youth and Community Development :Abu Dhabi	2013	136	ISBN 9789948071273, 9948071271	869744081
Lost poems by Ahmed Amin Al-Madani.	Arabic	Abu Dhabi: Cultural Foundation.	2001	154		50394565
Dibba: In the pre-Islamic era and the beginning of Islam.	Arabic	Dibba Al-Hisn Association for Culture, Arts and Theater	1998	87		57743613

== See also ==
- Awad Al Darmaki
