= Muhammad ibn Ahmad al-Aqili =

Saudi poet and historian

- Born: 1916; Sabya, Jazan, Saudi Arabia
- Died: 2 January 2003 (aged 86–87)
- Occupation: Writer
- Writing career
- Language: Arabic
- Genre: Literature
- Notable awards: Gold Pioneer Medal for Saudi Pioneers

Muhammad ibn Ahmad Al-Aqili Al-Hashimi (Arabic: محمد بن أحمد العقيلي; 1336 AH - 1423 AH / 1916–2003) was a Saudi poet and historian, one of the pioneers of modern literature in the Jazan region. He founded the Jazan Literary Club with his friend Muhammad Ali Al-Senussi, and was the first president of the club. Together, they wrote the book (Poets of the South), which is the first modern literary work in Jazan, and his poem (Champion of Dejour) translated into French and published in Le Monde newspaper.

He worked as director of Jazan finance in 1937, director of the orphanage in Jazan in 1958, director of the labor office, and was a member of the municipal and administrative council in Jazan. He was a romantic poet, and he published 3 collections, including (Lighting Melodies) in 1971, and (Rad Al-Duha) in 1981. He was passionate about the countryside and fond of Tihamah region in general and Jazan in particular, and this was evident in his historical and geographical writings on the region. This was a reason for comparing him to the scholar Abu Muhammad al-Hamdani.

Among his most prominent books in history (The History of Al-Mikhlaf Al-Sulaimani), which he issued in 3 parts, was completely printed in 1982. Al-Aqili wrote it when he was not over eighteen. He has a number of studies and literary and linguistic investigations. He received the Gold Pioneering Medal and was honored with the Saudi Pioneers at the First Saudi Writers Conference in 1974. In 2002 he was transferred by royal order from King Fahd Hospital in Jazan to King Faisal Specialist Hospital in Jeddah seeking treatment, but he died there on 2 January 2003.

== Birth and upbringing ==
Al-Aqili was born in Sabya, belonging to the Jazan region in the south of the Kingdom of Saudi Arabia in 1336 AH corresponding to 1916, and studied at the hands of the teacher Muhammad Khamis Bagbeer in Sabya. Then he read from his father the principles of jurisprudence and Arabic language grammar, then he studied under Sheikh Ahmed Al-Ahdal in Sabya also, then he studied in the circle of Sheikh Aqil bin Ahmed in Jazan.

== Career ==
Al-Aqili worked in the Ministry of Finance, Jazan branch in 1356 AH, and moved in its various departments until he reached the rank of Director of the Revenue Department in 1369 AH.

In the year 1377 AH, Al-Aqili was chosen to work in the orphanage in Jazan, and then joined the labor office to work there.

Al-Aqili was also chosen as a member of the Municipal Council and the Administrative Council in Jazan.

In 1395 AH, Al-Aqili founded the Jazan Literary Club and continued as its president until 1400 AH.

Al-Aqili was awarded at the first conference of Saudi writers in Makkah Al-Mukarramah in 1394 AH corresponding to 1974 the Gold Pioneer Medal for Saudi Pioneers.

He donated his private library to King Saud University in Riyadh in 1408 AH corresponding to 1987.

== Books ==
Al-Aqili has written many books of literature, poetry and investigation, more than thirty books, including:

- A poetry collection entitled Lightning Melodies in 1392 AH.
- A poetry collection entitled Afawiq Al-Ghamam in 1402 AH.
- Diwans of the two Sultans, study, analysis and investigation in 1374 AH.
- Jizan poet Ibn Htimel, study, analysis and investigation in the year 1380 AH.
- Jizan poet Ibn Shajar study, analysis and investigation in 1385 AH.
- Breath of the lute in the biography of the state of Sharif Hamoud Al-Abd Al-Rahman bin Ahmed Al-Bahkali.
- Al-Hassan bin Ahmed bin Aakes, investigation and study in 1402 AH.
- Al-Mikhlaf Al-Sulaymani in Political and Social History, three parts in 1378 AH.
- Sufism in Tihama Studies in 1389 AH.
- Geographical lexicon about Jazan region in 1389 AH.
- Folk literature in the south, studies and texts in 1389 AH.
- Historical monuments in Jazan region in the year 1399 AH.
- Lights on literature and writers in the Jazan region in 1400 AH.
- Dictionary of local dialects, comparative linguistic studies, 1403 AH.
- Souk Okaz in history in 1404 AH.
- Sheikh Muhammad bin Abd al-Wahhab, his scientific and practical life in 1404 AH.

== Death ==
Al-Aqili's suffering with the disease began a month before his death, as he was admitted to King Fahd Hospital in Jazan, and his illness was diagnosed as a stroke, and after his health began to deteriorate, an order was issued by the Royal Court that a medical evacuation plane transported him to the Specialized Hospital in Jeddah. After medical examinations, it was found that The symptom was not a stroke, but severe chest pains with urinary tract problems, then health problems began to increase on him, until he died at King Faisal Specialist Hospital in Jeddah in 1423 AH corresponding to 2002 at the age of 86 years.

== See also ==
- Tahir Zamakhshari
- Abdullah bin Khamis
- Muhammad Aziz Arfaj
