= Abdullah bin Idris =

Saudi Arabian writer (1929–2021)

- عبدالله بن عبدالعزيز بن إدريس
- Born: 1929; Harmah
- Died: 2021 (aged 91–92)
- Education: College of Islamic Law
- Occupations: Author, poet,
- Writing career
- Language: Arabic
- Notable works: In My Ship, Sailing With No Sea

Abdullah bin Idris (Arabic: عبدالله بن إدريس; 1929–2021) was a Saudi Arabian author and poet; he was born in Harmah, and he died aged 92 years old in October 2021.

Idris was known for his contribution in the cultural literary movement in Saudi Arabia.

He received a diploma from the Riyadh Institute, then his bachelor's degrees from the College of Islamic Law. He started his career as an author early, and his book, Contemporary Poets, is considered to be one of the most notable documentations of the history of literature in the Arabian Peninsula, and the symbolism of poetry.

== Career and notable works ==
Idris's career revolved around working in several governmental positions.

In addition, he was the president of the Riyadh Literature Club, a secretary-general of Imam Muhammad Ibn Saud Islamic University, along with being manager of the culture and publishing department.

Moreover, he was a member of its scientific council.

Furthermore, he was editor-in-chief of the newspaper Daawah, that he started and began publishing in 1965, along with being director general of Islamic Dawah Press Foundation, making him the first Saudi Arabian journalist to merge between the two jobs of journalism and religion.

=== Contemporary poets ===
Idris published a number of poetical and literature works, including his book, Contemporary Poets, which he wrote in the 1960s, where he gives critiques about contemporary poets.

== List of publications ==
In My Ship
Sailing without Sea
Do I Leave Before You do?
The Rhyme of Life
The Playing Pens
Its My Nation
Poetry and Poets during the Second Half of the 14th Century AH
The Best of Sayings (A Poetry Analysis)
King Abdulaziz as portrayed by Arab Poets

== Idris's memberships in cultural institutions ==
Idris was a member in a number of cultural institutions, including:

- Member of the board of directors at King Abdulaziz's Management, at the time of its establishment
- Member of Al-Dara magazine's editorial board
- Member of the Scientific Council at Imam University
- Member of the board of directors at Press Call Foundation
- Member of the Aseer Press Foundation's General Assembly
- Honorary Member at International Islamic Literature Association
- Honorary Member at the Association of Modern Literature in Egypt.

Some of Idris's cultural contributions were outside Saudi Arabia. He represented Saudi Arabia in several international poetry conferences and festivals, including:

- Abu Firas Al-Hamdani Festival in Aleppo, Syria in 1962
- The 10th edition of the Arab Writers Conference and the 12th edition of the Festival of Arab Poetry in Algeria in 1974
- Marbad Festival in Iraq for 6 consecutive years.
- When he was editor-in-chief of Al-Dawa newspaper, he represented it at the 3rd edition of the Arab Summit Conference in Casablanca, Morocco, in 1962, with the press delegation accompanying King Faisal.
- Abdulaziz Al-Babtain Poetry Festival in Kuwait, Egypt, Lebanon, Libya, Algeria and Iran.
- Festival at the International Islamic Literature Association, in Turkey in 1989.

== Academic writings about Idris ==
1. Abdullah bin Idris: Poet and Critic, Dr. Muhammad Al-Sadiq Afifi “Cairo University”
2. Abdullah bin Idris: His life, Aftermaths, and What was Written about Him: Dr. Amin Seydou - Literary Club in Riyadh
3. Abdullah Bin Idris: His Biography and Poetry, A Master Thesis: Prepared by Fatima Bint Abdullah Al-Tamimi.
