= Muhammad Aziz Arfaj =

- محمد عزيز العرفج
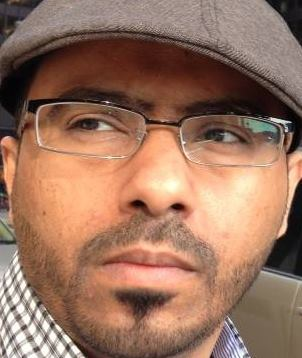
- Born: 15 October 1979 (age 46); Riyadh, Saudi Arabia
- Occupation: Writer
- Writing career
- Language: Arabic

Muhammad Aziz Al-Arfaj is a Saudi writer, poet and journalist.

== Biography ==
He was born on 15 October 1980 in the city of Riyadh and raised there after his father moved for a long period of time from Khab Al-Muraydisiyah, one of the villages adjacent to the city of Buraidah in Al-Qassim region, north of Najd, and his marriage to his mother, who belongs to the Banu Al-Asmar tribe in Asir, southern Saudi Arabia.

His father, who came from a rural family interested in agriculture, was an inspector and advisor in the Saudi Ministry of Interior after completing his university education at the College of Sharia in Riyadh. He was a popular poet, oral tale narrator, memorizer of lengthy Arabic anecdotes, and a lover of history, while his mother, who was also from a mountainous environment, was concerned with in agriculture as well, an abyss of collecting intangible heritage, and saying folk poetry.

Arfaj is a researcher in Nabati poetry, al-Humayni poetry, al-Hourani poetry, folklore, and popular poetry in the Arab world. He writes in Al-Riyadh newspaper in particular and in many Arab and international newspapers and has published many books, novels and books. The most prominent of them is the novel "The Top Floor" and the book "Popular Heritage In The Arab Narrative".

In 2003, he moved from the city of Riyadh to the city of Aden in Yemen to work for several years in the diplomatic corps, and his name was closely associated with the Yemeni cultural scene through his work for years during which he was able to approach Yemeni heritage and literature, and this crystallized in the form of dozens of studies that he wrote On Yemeni literature and the Humayni poetry in particular, and a novel titled "The Top Floor" was published for him, which was printed in Beirut, its events take place in the Yemeni environment.

In Yemen, he made contributions to the Hamini Nabatean relations between the Humayni and Nabati poetry and he is also the first to discover the original homeland of Bani Hilal, the owners of the Hilali biography.

Then he submitted his resignation from working in the Saudi diplomatic corps and returned to Riyadh to be a member of the Literary Club in Riyadh. He resided in the city of Chicago in the United States of America, and established the Spiritual Cultural Forum there before returning again to Riyadh and settling there.

== His books ==
=== Poetry ===
Title	Language	Publisher	Year	Pages	ISBN
The Seasons – a Divan of Free Poetry.	Arabic		2016		
Rural Najd – A Divan of Nabati Poetry.	Arabic		2020		
The Land of Yemen – A Divan of Humayni's Poetry	Arabic				
Clouds of Love: A Divan of Nabati Poetry.	Arabic		2020	141	ISBN 978-603-8324-78-3

=== Short story ===
Title	Language	Publisher	Year	Pages	ISBN	OCLC Number
Shivers between crying and terror.	Arabic	Al-intishar Alarabi Foundation	2018	46	ISBN 9789953931456, 9953931453	1141735673
Wednesday Troubles	Arabic		2016	61	ISBN 9786144048566	
And She Came Back After An Absence.	Arabic		2018			
A Piece Of Ice.	Arabic		2019			

=== Novel ===
Title	Language	Publisher	Year	Pages
The Top Floor.	Arabic	Dar Al-Gawon	2011	128

=== Children's literature and arts ===
Title	Language	Publisher	Year	Pages	ISBN	OCLC Number
Saqt Allewa: a novel for boys.	Arabic	Hail Literary and Cultural Club	2017	71	ISBN 9786039086932, 6039086939	1193218981
Baby Feather Series.	Arabic					

=== Women's culture and arts ===
Title	Language	Year	ISBN
A Woman's Feelings (Part One) Early life, poets, readings, dialogues.	Arabic	2016	ISBN 978-603-8301-12-8
A Woman's Feelings (Part Two) Formation Sculpture Orgami	Arabic	2020	ISBN 978-603-8301-13-5

=== Literature letters ===
Title	Language	Year
From Ali Saleh to Mr. Trump.	Arabic	2020
To whom do you leave your son, father?.	Arabic	2020

=== Literary and intellectual studies ===
Title	Language	Publisher	Year	Pages	ISBN	OCLC Number
Myths of the Islamic Awakening: Studies	Arabic	Arwiqah Foundation for Studies, Translation and Publishing: Ruya Center for Studies	2019	220	ISBN 9789777971898, 9777971893, 9789777971997, 9777971990	1104685524
Folk tale and oral poetry in theatre, story and novel: Studies.	Arabic	Najran Literary and Cultural Club	2019	190	ISBN 9789777972123, 9777972121	1122542928
The roots of Nabati poetry in the art of chanting and weights and the rooting of Nabati poetry and the stages of its development and its influence by Hamini and the Sufi school.	Arabic	Hamalil Foundation for Media	2015		ISBN 9789948184553, 9948184556	1291960392
Folklore in the Arab narrative.	Arabic	The Arabic Magazine.	2013		ISBN 978-603-8138-53-3	1049184190
Captain of the investigations of folk arts in the Arab Gulf.	Arabic		2014	68		
Nabati Poetry Roots.	Arabic	Hamalil Foundation for Media	2015	220		

=== Co-author ===
Title	Language	Year	Note
Sultan of Songs and difficult departure.	Arabic	2013	with other Arab writers.
Abdul Karim Al -Jahiman .. Echoes of departure.	Arabic	2014	with other Saudi writers.
Narratives of Khaled Al-Youssef	Arabic	2020	with other Arab writers.

== See also ==
- Tahir Zamakhshari
- Abdullah bin Khamis
- Muhammad ibn Ahmad al-Aqili
