= Hazim Abdallah Khedr =

Iraqi historian and researcher (1932–1998)

- Native name: حازم عبد الله خضر
- Born: 1932 Mosul, Iraq
- Died: 1998 (aged 65–66) Baghdad
- Occupation: Professor
- Language: Arabic

Hazem Abdullah Khader (1932 - 1998) was an Iraqi historian and researcher who specialized in Andalusian Arabic literature. He has published research is considered one of the Islamic preachers from the Muslim Brotherhood School in Iraq.

== Birth and upbringing ==
Khader was born in 1932 in the Iraqi city of Mosul to an Arab Muslim family and attended the mosques of Mosul since his early youth. He belonged to the Muslim Brotherhood in Iraq and he also contacted this group when he was studying for a bachelor's degree at the University of Baghdad, which allowed Sheikh Muhammad Mahmoud al-Sawaf to influence him closely.

== Education ==
Khader graduated in 1956 from the Department of Arabic Language, College of Arts, University of Baghdad, with a bachelor of arts in Arabic language and literature. In 1967, he joined graduate studies at Ain Shams University in Egypt and obtained a master's degree in Andalusian literature for his thesis: "Ibn Shahid Al-Andalusi: His Life and Poetry" under the supervision of Dr. Abdel Qader Al-Qat. He also received a doctorate in Andalusian literature from the College of Arts at the University of Baghdad in 1978 for his thesis entitled: “Andalusian Prose in the Age of Sects and Almoravids”, under the supervision of Prof. Dr. Salah Khalis.

== Career ==
Khader worked as a teacher of Arabic and religion in 1956, in a number of Mosul intermediate and secondary schools, the last of which was in the Western Preparatory School, until he left for Ain Shams University to obtain a master's degree.

After completing his postgraduate studies in 1972, he moved into academia, and was based at the University of Mosul in the Department of Arabic Language in the College of Arts where he taught Andalusian literature until he was promoted to the rank of professor. He remained in university teaching for several years. In 1977, the government institutions expelled him from the university due to his Islamic political activity, to the Directorate of Education in Mosul, along with political activists such as Prof. Dr. Imad Al-Din Khalil and Prof. Dr. Taha Mohsen. In 1986, he was returned to the University of Mosul and to his faculty, the College of Arts.

== Books ==
- Andalusian Prose in the Age of Sects and Almoravids.
- Ibn Shahid al-Andalusi: his life and literature.
- Description of the animal in Andalusian poetry: the era of the cults and the Almoravids.

== Articles ==
- Puffs from Arafat.
- Ibn Bassam and his book Al Thakhira.
- The scholar and writer Abdul Malik bin Habib.
- The writer Abu Al-Mughirah bin Hazm Al-Andalusi: A study in his prose.
- Abu Marwan Ibn Hayyan, a writer.
- Islamic features in the poetry of Abu Tammam.
- Jihadi Prose in the Age of the Almoravids.
- The features of Islamic civilization in the sermons of the Prophet, may God bless him and grant him peace.
- Among the figures of culture in Andalusia: the literary judge Munther bin Saeed Al-Balouti.
- Abu Abdullah Al-Humaidi and his book “Jethwat Al-Muqtabas”.
- Education in Andalusia until the end of the fourth century.

== Political and advocacy activities ==
Khader belonged to the Muslim Brotherhood, and one of his colleagues in the organization was Professor Educator Ghanem Hammoudat. Khader was persecuted during the royal era because of his advocacy activity.

He was arrested for a period after the July 14, 1958 coup and the explosion of the Shawaf movement in Mosul. He was also arrested on March 8, 1959, then released.

The security services did not hesitate to pursue him. Ibrahim Khalil Al-Allaf, professor of modern history at the University of Mosul, said: “I cannot describe how happy he was when I gave him a copy of an official document, which is a security report written about him in 1956 when he was a student at the College of Arts - University of Baghdad. In it, he belongs to the Islamic Brothers Association, and he and a number of his fellow students went to Tal Afar and Sinjar to spread the ideas of this association. I had obtained this document from the files of Nineveh Governate since the early seventies of the last century when I was completing my master’s thesis on the Wilayat of Mosul.”

The previous regime removed Khader from the university to the Directorate of Education in Mosul for the period from 1977 to 1986, because of his Islamic political activity.

== Death ==
He died in 1998 in a hospital in Baghdad after suffering from brain cancer. He underwent surgery and died of cardiac arrest a week after the operation was successful.
