= Constantin Zureiq =

Syrian historian and academic (1909–2000)

- قسطنطين زريق
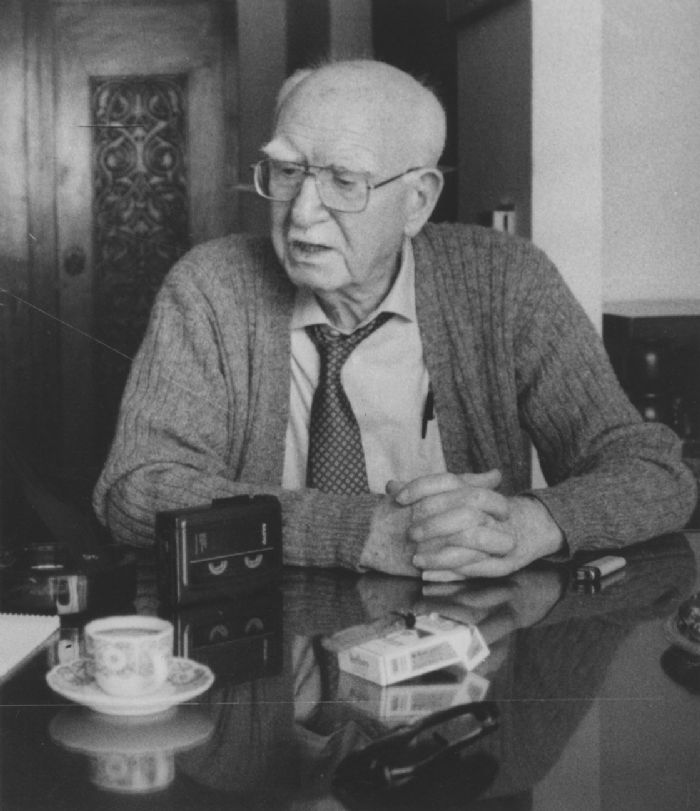

Acting President of the American University of Beirut
- In office 1954–1957
- Preceded by: Stephen Beasley Linnard Penrose, Jr.
- Succeeded by: Fouad Elskaf

Personal details
- Born: April 18, 1909 Damascus, Syria Vilayet, Ottoman Syria
- Died: August 11, 2000 (aged 91) Beirut, Lebanon
- Spouse: Najla Cortas (m. 1940)
- Children: 4, including Afaf
- Education: American University of Beirut; Princeton University; University of Michigan
- Profession: Professor; academic

Constantin Zureiq, or Constantine Zurayk (Arabic: قسطنطين زريق, romanized: Qusṭanṭīn Zurayq, pronounced [qʊsˤtˤɑnˈtˤiːn zʊˈrɑjq]; April 18, 1909 – August 11, 2000), was a prominent Syrian intellectual who was one of the first to pioneer and express the importance of Arab nationalism. He stressed the urgent need to transform stagnant Arab society utilizing rational thought and radical modification of the methods of thinking and acting. Some of his ideas, such as the "Arab mission" and "national philosophy" became key concepts for Arab nationalist thinkers. He was a strong proponent of the intellectual reformation of Arab society, emphasizing the need for rationalism and an ethical revolution.

Zurayik is credited with coining the term Nakba (Arabic for 'Catastrophe') in his 1948 book Ma'na an-Nakba (The Meaning of the Disaster), to refer to the mass expulsion of Arabs from historic Palestine following the 1948 Arab–Israeli war.

== Life and academic career ==
Constantin Zurayk was born in Damascus, Syria Vilayet on April 18, 1909, during the waning years of the ruling Ottoman Empire, to a Greek Orthodox Christian family. He received his primary and secondary education in the Orthodox school systems and had an obsession with acquiring knowledge. He continued his education at the American University of Beirut, and eventually received his PhD at Princeton University all by the age of twenty-one. He immediately turned to teaching and became a professor of history at the American University of Beirut.

After receiving his PhD, Zurayk focused his aims in teaching and politics. Alongside his work as a tenured professor, Zurayk experimented as the 1st Counselor to the Syrian Legation of the United States in 1945, and acted as the delegate to the UN Security Council and to the UN General Assembly in 1946.

Zurayk later took an offer to become the vice president of the American University of Beirut in 1952, and completed his education by receiving his doctorate in literature at the University of Michigan in 1967.

He died 11 August 2000 in Beirut.

== Views on Arab society ==
During the last fifty years of his life, Zurayk dedicated himself in attempting to solve the various issues revolving around Arab society. His goal was to discover a means of radically and expeditiously transforming Arab society into a practical, rational, and scientific society. Zurayk focused his attention on contemporary Arab society and the current crisis of Arab civilization. He blamed the change in Arab personality as the reason for the weakened Arab civilization. Zurayk noted that the turning away from the "ideas of unity, loyalty, and the universal outlook led to the replacement of the spiritual motivations with material ones". Although this process of decline was an internal cause, Zurayk attributed the cause of the Nahda, or modern Arab renaissance, to external factors. One of the external contributors, which Zurayk believed played a significant role in demanding change in Arab society, was "Western" or modern civilization. Because the West would continue to impose itself on Arab society, it was imperative that the Arabs work to understand and comprehend it in order to confront it. Zurayk urged the Arab society to keep up with modern civilization and accept, rather than disregard, the scientific and technological influences of modern civilization.

In order to revitalize the Arab society, Zurayk demanded that there must be a radical change in Arab life. He called "for science and productivity," and warned that the advancement of Arab society is dependent on whether that notion became a part of Arabs' "feelings and thoughts and a source of their will".

Although science and technology were of utmost importance, Zurayk considered ideals of citizenship, nationalism, and unity as additional, necessary requirements for the modernization of Arab society. Zurayk insisted that the combination of rational powers and ethical powers would lead to a successful future.

Zurayk delved deeper to describe the primary challenge of Arab civilization. He believed rationalism was the "prerequisite that encompassed all other prerequisites" for a future, modern Arab society. The cultural backwardness remained the most dangerous battle in the fight for a modern Arab society, and only through rational thinking would the Arab society look towards the future, realize their human potentials, and build a higher civilization.

Zurayk made it clear that Arab society must join the modern world, and to do this, they must change their previous ways. Zurayk even left a list of changes that must be made in order for a revolution to succeed: there must be use of the machine on a wide scale, the state and religion must be separated, the scientific spirit of each individual and the society as a whole must be invigorated, and Arab society must be open toward the rational and spiritual values of other human civilizations.

== Reflection and evaluation of Arab culture ==
For Zurayk, the human powers that make culture are the civilizational powers of human reason in its critical and creative functions. Zurayk focused on the values of honesty, hard work, perseverance, seriousness, commitment, responsibility, and freedom as the values that allow humans to acquire scientific knowledge and to develop a sense of beauty and justice. In this regard, Zurayk was inspired by the prominent Egyptian intellectual, Taha Hussein, who sternly believed that the advancement of Arab society was dependent on the education of every individual. Hussein was the Minister of Education at Cairo University in 1950 and was eventually able to provide free education for all Egyptians. Both intellectuals sought to help Arab people uncover their hidden gems that would lead to a more advanced Arab society. Zurayk focused on encouraging the Arab people to access their hidden human powers which would enable them to work toward a just and moral society. He introduced what he called the "revolution of reason," where he called for a national Arab unity based on a "secular democracy in which diverse individuals and communities can fulfill themselves in a framework of tolerance and mutual respect".

== Contribution to Arab nationalism ==
For Zurayk, Arab nationalism was a "civilizational project rather than a defensive obsession with identity boundaries in need of protection". For the project to become successful, the responsibilities of the Arab people were great. Zurayk emphasized that Arab culture must be "earned and created by human effort". In his book In the Battle for Culture (1964), Zurayk further stresses the importance of the decisive role of human agency:

"The main factors in civilizational changes are in our view acquired volitional human factors.... Natural or environmental factors, such as race and heredity, geographic situation, economic system, and social, intellectual, and moral conditions, are all possibilities or bonds. And possibilities and bonds do not make life, nor do they give rise to cultures. It is the human being who becomes aware of these bonds and strives to overcome them, and who realizes the possibilities and works to fulfill them, who is the maker. It is with this awareness and this striving that civilizations rise and fall".

Zurayk essentially rejected the doctrines of determinism and monism that prevailed in theories of culture such as the progressive reason in European Enlightenment thinking, the evolutionary progress in the positivism of Darwin, and the will of God in monotheism. He believed the doctrines to be "superimposed on human history rather than derived from its concrete givens".

Zurayk's first notable publication, based on a lecture that he gave in 1938, was entitled The Arab Consciousness (al-Wa`i al-`Arabi). In the book, he introduced the concept of the "Arab mission" and stated that the aim of each nation was "the message it brings to human culture and general civilization" and that a nation without a mission was not worthy of the name. The consciousness of having a "national mission" would bring the Arab struggle for independence new strength and meaning and would regain for the Arabs their world role. As for the Arab mission itself, in the current age it would be "to absorb the knowledge of the West and to join it with the views that have arisen in reaction to it, and to combine them in a new unity that will be a sign of the coming life, and that the Arabs will spread to the world as they spread their brilliant civilization in the past ages".

It was also in this work that Zurayk called for a "national philosophy", which he expressed as the thought absorbed by the youth of the nation combined with their feelings to form a "nationalist creed." Such a philosophy, he declared, was necessary for national renewal.

== Debate of nationalism and religion ==
While many enlightened thinkers believed religion was not a determining factor of a nation, Zurayk "sought to establish a rapport between Islam and Arab nationalism". Throughout his research and observation, Zurayk indeed made a connection between religion and nationalism. Although he was not Muslim himself, Zurayk believed Islam was the missing link for Arab nationalism. Arab society was spiritually awakened "wherever [Islam] was established and spread." To Zurayk, it was simple: whenever Islam was flourishing, so was Arab civilization; and whenever Islam "reduced itself to beliefs transmitted blindly and religious laws and statutes unwisely imposed, Arab civilization waned".

Many Arab thinkers insisted the Arab nation existed and prospered prior to Islam, while Islamists define the nation based on the religious community. Zurayk looked at the issue from a different perspective. In essence, he viewed Arab Nationalism as a spiritual movement much like any religion, Islam in particular. He made clear, "true nationalism cannot in any way contradict true religion, for in its essence it is a spiritual movement which aims at resurrecting the inner forces of the nation and at realizing its intellectual and spiritual potentialities".

Furthermore, Zurayk explained the significance of Muhammad and his connection to Arab nationalism. He reiterated the importance of cultural heritage in that it must not be forgotten to build a modern Arab society. Zurayk explained how Muhammad came to the Arab world in a time of great need and unified the community. He was a man of conviction who put up with persecution and humiliation all for the sake of inspiring and transforming his fellow companions to broaden their horizons and access their potentials to build a new civilization. Zurayk concluded his argument by saying: "Whatever his sect or religious community, therefore, it is the duty of every Arab to interest himself in his past culture. This interest is the first duty enjoined on him by his nationality. He must come forward to study Islam and understand its true nature and thus sanctify the memory of the great Prophet to whom Islam was revealed".

== Engagement in intellectual debate ==
For Zurayk, the role of intellectuals remained crucial in efforts to "raise the level of the masses" and bring Arab society out of its weakened condition. Analyzing the Arab response to their failure to prevent the establishment of Israel, Zurayk wrote in his book Ma'na an-Nakba that:

"Seven Arab states declare war on Zionism in Palestine, stop impotent before it, and turn on their heels. The representatives of the Arabs deliver fiery speeches in the highest international forums, warning what the Arab state and peoples will do if this or that decision be enacted. Declarations fall like bombs from the mouths of officials at the meetings of the Arab League, but when action becomes necessary, the fire is still and quiet and steel and iron are rusted and twisted, quick to bend and disintegrate".

Zurayk later reaffirms his thoughts on stagnant Arab society by stating:

"The reason for the victory of the Zionists was that the roots of Zionism are grounded in modern Western life, while we for the most part are still distant from this life and hostile to it. They live in the present and for the future, while we continue to dream the dreams of the past and to stupefy ourselves with its fading glory".

In Lisan al-Arab, the word Nakba is described as “one of the calamities of the ages.”

== Arab liberal thought ==
Zurayk had a strong view on history and rejected all forms of "historical determinism and all forms of dogmatic ideological reading of history". His most critical belief was that of Arab history in particular. He rejected the thin view of Arab history that limited it to Islamic history. Zurayk felt Arab history needed to be understood in the widest sense possible and needed to be explored in connection with other ancient civilizations of the area. He firmly expressed that history should be judged with a mind completely free of dogma.

Zurayk's "revolution of reason" proved to be his most influential contribution to modern Arab liberal thought. He called for a national Arab unity based on a "secular democracy in which diverse individuals and communities can fulfill themselves in a framework of tolerance and mutual respect". Since Zurayk grew up in an Orthodox Christian family, tolerance was a key tenet. In order to have a unified and sufficient Arab society, Zurayk asked for openness to interfaith dialogue and conflict resolution with such communities as the Jews, Christians, and Muslims.

Unlike other Arab intellectuals, Zurayk did not see reason as the blind imitation of the West. Rather, he saw critical reason more as the "dominating characteristic of modernity, with all its achievements and weaknesses". Like enlightenment through critical reason, Arab unity still remained the ultimate goal in the eyes of Zurayk. His approach was distinguished by an "ethical concern for unity's ends and means. This unity, for him, [was] not the telos of an inexorable ethnic or religious destiny, but a form of solidarity for mutual empowerment by democratic means aimed at serving both individuals' and communities' dignity and freedom".

== Major works ==
- On National Awakening (1939)
- What is to be done? An address to the rising Arab generations (1939)
- The Arab Consciousness (1939)
- The Meaning of ‘Nakba’ (1948)
- Facing History (1959)
- We and History (1959)
- In The Battle For Culture (1964)
- Facing The Future (1977)
- What to Do? (1998)
