= Abdullah bin Khamis =

Saudi researcher, writer and poet (1920–2011)

- عبد الله بن محمد بن خميس
- Born: 1920; Aldiria, Saudi Arabia
- Died: 2011 (aged 90–91); Alriyadh
- Occupations: Writer and historian
- Writing career
- Language: Arabic

Abdullah bin Muhammad bin Khamis (Arabic: عبد الله بن محمد بن خميس), a Saudi researcher, writer and poet, was one of the most prominent writers interested in literature, history, geography, thought and culture in the Kingdom of Saudi Arabia.

== Life and academic study ==
He was born in 1339 AH / 1919 AD in the village of Al-Mulqi, one of the villages of Al-Diriyah in the Riyadh region. In his childhood, his family moved to Al-Diriyah, where he learned the principles of reading and writing in a book that teaches children called Abdul Rahman bin Muhammad Al-Hussan, who was an imam and memorizer of the Qur’an. Abdullah bin Khamis faced difficulties during his wanderings in the desert, which made him excel in his writings about mountains and valleys, and in his early days his scientific output was no more than reading, writing and arithmetic in public schools of Al-Diriyah and what he learned from his father in reading books such as Ibn Taymiyyah’s books, Ibn al-Qayyim, Sahih al-Bukhari and a collection of hadiths, and memorizing some poems, stories and novels. He joined Dar al-Tawhid School in Taif when it was opened in 1364 AH - 1944 AD, where he joined it in the preliminary section to take the primary certificate there and continued to work in same school. And he was assigned by Professor Hamad Al-Jasser to supervise the printing of Al-Yamamah magazine in Makkah Al-Mukarramah, and after he graduated from the college, he set out to start working life.

== Career ==
Abdullah Al-Khamis was a member of many scientific, cultural and social organizations inside and outside the Kingdom of Saudi Arabia, including:

- Academy of the Arabic language in Damascus.
- Academy of the Arabic Language in Cairo.
- Iraqi Scientific Academy.
- High Media Council.
- Board of Directors of King Abdul Aziz House.
- Board of Directors of the Arab Journal.
- Board of Directors of Al Jazeera Foundation for Press, Printing and Publishing.
- Al-Ber Society in Riyadh.

== Cultural contributions ==
- He is the first president of the literary club in Riyadh
- Deputy of Prince Salman bin Abdulaziz in the People's Committee for the Care of the Families and Mujahideen of Palestine.
- In the year 1379 AH - 1959 AD, in cooperation with Sheikh Abdul Aziz Al-Rubaie, he issued Al-Jazirah magazine and is considered one of the founders of the press in the Kingdom of Saudi Arabia, and in Najd in particular. Al-Jazirah magazine was then turned into a daily newspaper.
- The Saudi and Arab press published him many researches and articles.
- Represented the Kingdom of Saudi Arabia in several literary and scientific conferences.
- He has many lectures inside and outside the Kingdom of Saudi Arabia.
- He has many radio and television participations, including his radio program, which lasted for four years (who said), and his television program Councils of Faith.
- The literature of travels in the life of Abdullah bin Khamis has an important position, and he made several trips in the entire Arabian Peninsula. He also visited most of the Arab countries from the ocean to the Gulf, in addition to visiting some countries in Asia, Europe and North America.

== Awards and honors ==
- He was awarded the State Appreciation Award in Literature in 1404 AH.
- Awarding the King Abdul Aziz scarf of the first degree in the honorable cultural personality in the seventeenth Janadriyah Festival in the year 1422 AH - 2002 AD.
- He was awarded the Honorary Medal and Medal from the Gulf Cooperation Council in Muscat in the year 1410 AH - 1989 AD.
- He received a Fatah sash and medal from the Palestine Liberation Organization.
- He was awarded the French Knight's Medal of Honor awarded to him by the French President (François Mitterrand).
- He received the Order of Culture from Tunisia, which was awarded to him by President Habib Bourguiba.
- A certificate of honor from the Emir of the State of Bahrain, Sheikh Isa bin Salman Al Khalifa, on the occasion of celebrating the pioneers of social work from the Gulf countries, in the year 1407 AH - 1987 AD.
- He received many awards, medals, certificates and shields in many forums and occasions.

== His Poetry ==
The first incident that showed the genius of Ibn Khamis in writing and recitation was when King Abdulaziz visited Taif and descended Hawiyah. A group of employees of Dar Al-Tawhid School, headed by the director and some teachers, gathered to go to King Abdul Aziz there and greet him. One of the distinguished students had to be chosen to recite a poem in the hands of the king. The choice fell on Ibn Khamis, who prepared a remarkable poem of more than twenty verses. This poem is one of the first poems of Ibn Khamis.

And that poetic talent continued to increase, and Ibn Khamis was present with the intuition and poetic flow; Which made the people of his town Al-Diriyah choose him to recite a poem in front of King Saud at the ceremony held by the people on the occasion of King Saud's visit to Al-Diriyah after he took power. Ibn Khamis answered the request of the people of his town and wrote the poem as he said: “I was building the poem while I was on the plane.”

== Writings ==
He enriched the Arab Library with tens of books in literature, poetry, criticism, heritage, and travels. He visited the press, forums and conferences inside and outside the Kingdom, namely:

=== Journeys ===
#	Book	Year	Publisher	Notes
1	A Month in Damascus	1375AH/1955م.	Alriyadh	
2	A tour of the American West.	1414AH/1994م.	Alfarazdak	

=== Literature and poetry ===
#	Book	Year	Publisher	Notes
3	Folk literature in the Arabian Peninsula.	1378AH/1958م.	Alfarazdak	
4	The strays.	1394AH/1974م.	Dar Al-Yamamah	Three parts.
5	Who says? Questions and answers in poetry, governance and proverbs.	1404AH/1984م.	Alfarazdak	Four parts.
6	War songs or Ardah poetry.	1402AH/1982م.	Alfarazdak	368 pages.
7	The second court.	1413AH/1993م.	Alfarazdak	
8	Symbols of folk poetry stem from its eloquent origin.	1412AH/1992م.	Alfarazdak	

=== Geographical literature ===
#	Book	Year	Publisher	Notes
9	Metaphor between Yamama and Hijaz.	1390AH/1970م.	Dar Al-Yamamah	
10	Al Jazeera Mountains Dictionary.	1410AH/1989م.	Alfarazdak	five parts
11	Geographical dictionary of the Kingdom of Saudi Arabia .Al-Yamamah Dictionary.	1398AH/1978م.	Dar Al-Yamamah	tow parts.
12	Glossary of valleys of the island.	1419AH.	Alfarazdak	tow parts.
13	The sands of the island: the Empty Quarter.	1419AH/1998م.	Alfarazdak	

=== Historical literary ===
#	Book	Year	Publisher	Notes
14	Al-Diriyah the First Capital.	1402AH/1982م.	Dar Alfarazdak	
15	Glimpses of the history of King Abdul Aziz.	1419AH/1998م.		An unpublished manuscript.
16	The History of Al-Yamamah (seven parts).	1407AH/1987م.	Alfarazdak	Seven parts

=== Criticism ===
#	Book	Year	Publisher	Notes
17	From Jihad Qalam [in criticism].	1402AH/1982م.	Alfarazdak	

=== Others ===
#	Book	Year	Publisher	Notes
18	Our country and oil.	1379AH/1959م.	Riyadh Literary Club.	
19	From the conversations at night.	1398AH/1978م.		
20	Rashid Al-Khalawi: his life - his poetry - his wisdom - his philosophy - his anecdotes - his astronomical calculation.	1392AH/1972م.	Dar Al-Yamamah	
21	From Jihad Qalam 2 [Fatih al-Jazirah].	1404AH/1984م.	Alfarazdak	
22	From Jihad Qalam 3 [lectures and research].	1405AH/1984م.	Alfarazdak	
23	On the Banks of Yamama: Echoes from Arabia.	1397AH/1977.	Alfarazdak	
24	Affairs and concerns from the reality of my life.	1413AH/1993م.		Unpublished manuscript.

== Death ==
On Wednesday the fifteenth of Jumada al-Thani 1432 AH, corresponding to May 18, 2011, Abdullah bin Khamis died in a hospital in Riyadh, after suffering from illness, at the age of 91 years.

== See also ==
- Muhammad ibn Ahmad al-Aqili
- Tahir Zamakhshari
- Muhammad Aziz Arfaj
