= Ahlam Khudr =

Sudanese activist

- Born: Shambat
- Citizenship: Sudan
- Occupations: Activist and nursery worker
- Children: 2

Ahlam Khudr (Arabic: أحلام خضر ‘Āḥlām Khuḍr) is a Sudanese activist and nursery worker.

== Biography and early life ==
Ahlam Khader was born in the Shambat neighbourhood, located on the eastern bank of the Nile in the city of Bahri, Sudan. Shambat is known as one of the oldest urban communities in the area.

Khudr's son was killed in a peaceful protest in 2013 (part of the 2011–13 protests in Sudan). Since then, she has been an activist, calling herself the "mother of all martyrs." Active in underground forums, she was "brutally beaten" when arrested by security forces. Ahlam Khudr's statement after the death of her son.

After my son's murder, I believe I gained a certainty that I may not be able to express in words, and a political maturity that drives me to always be on the streets. I consider my son's murder an eternal reminder of the necessity of struggle."

— Alrakoba.net, Her son died... the story of a mother who became an icon in sudan

In December 2018, Ahlam Khudr was an important figure in the Sudanese Revolution. In 2019, she was listed among the BBC's 100 Women.
