= Afaf Zurayk =

Lebanese artist (born 1948)

- عفاف زريق
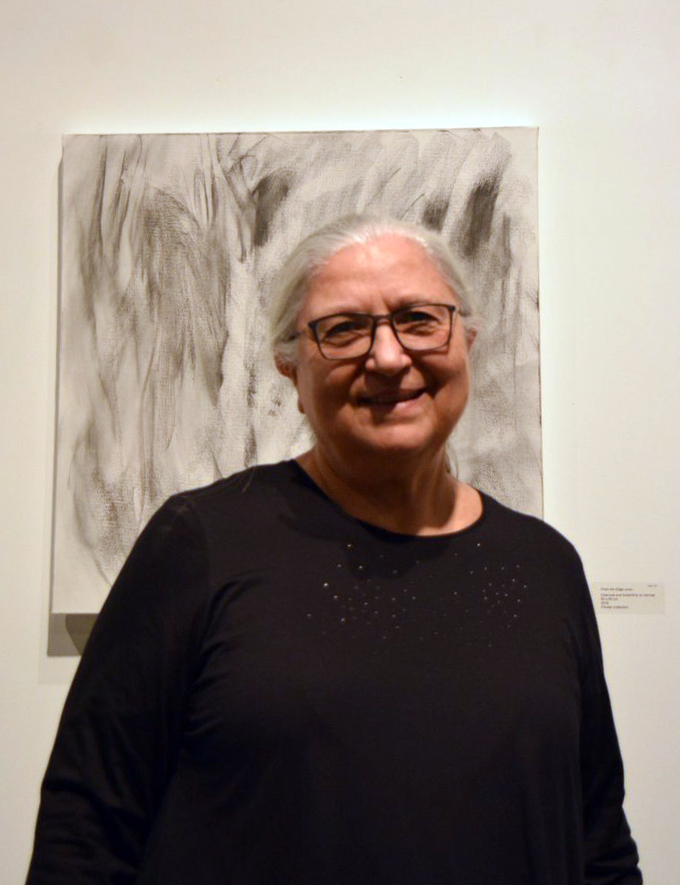
- Zurayk in 2021
- Born: 1948 (age 77–78); Beirut, Lebanon
- Education: American University of Beirut; Harvard University
- Known for: Painting; drawing; poetry
- Father: Constantin Zureiq
- Awards: Jouhayna Baddoura Prize for Art (2017)
- Website: afafzurayk.gallery

Afaf Zurayk (Arabic: عفاف زريق, romanized: ʿAfāf Zurayq; born 1948) is a Lebanese multimedia artist and poet living and working in Beirut.

== Biography ==
Born in Beirut, she is the daughter of the prominent Syrian intellectual Constantin Zureiq and his Lebanese wife Najla Cortas. Afaf Zurayk graduated from the American University of Beirut in 1970 with a BA in fine arts with distinction, and obtained an MA in Islamic art from Harvard University in 1972. She taught in Lebanon at the Beirut University College (now Lebanese American University) and the American University of Beirut, as well as in the continuing education programs of the Corcoran College of Art and Design and Georgetown University in Washington D.C.

== Books ==
To date, Afaf Zurayk has authored six books:

- My Father. Reflections, published by Rimal Books in 2010.
- lovesong, published by Rimal Books in 2011.
- Drawn poems, published 2012, a collection of drawings printed and bound in an edition of 500 copies.
- Return Journeys, a monograph published in 2019. Return Journeys Monograph was produced alongside its eponymous retrospective exhibition, held at Saleh Barakat Gallery in 2019.
- Drawn By Light, published in 2019 by the American University of Beirut Press.
- Beyond Art printed and bound in Lebanon.
