= Abu Zurayq, Suwayda =

Abu Zurayq أبو زريق Abu Zureiq
- Village
- Location within Syria
- Coordinates: 32°35′18″N 36°47′56″E
- Country: Syria
- Governorate: Suwayda
- District: Salkhad
- Subdistrict: Malah

Population (2004 census)
  - Total: 512
- Time zone: UTC+2 (EET)
  - Summer (DST): UTC+3 (EEST)

Abu Zurayq (Arabic: أبو زريق) is a village situated in the Salkhad District of Suwayda Governorate, in southern Syria. According to the Syria Central Bureau of Statistics (CBS), Abu Zurayq had a population of 512 in the 2004 census. Its inhabitants are predominantly Druze.

== See also ==
- Druze in Syria
