= Ahlam Bsharat =

Palestinian writer (born 1975)

- Native name: أحلام بشارات
- Born: 1975 (age 50–51) Tammun, Palestine
- Occupation: Writer
- Language: Arabic
- Education: An-Najah National University (BA, MA)

Ahlam Bsharat (Arabic: أحلام بشارات; born in 1975 in Tamoun) is a Palestinian writer and poet, born in the village of Tammun in the Jordan Valley, and a trainer specialized in creative writing. She is an author of short stories, picture books, novels, and memoirs. Ahlam Bsharat is considered one of the most prominent names produced young people's literature and short stories in Palestine. She has written four novels for young people, dozens of children's stories, and two short story collections. Bsharat gained great attention after publishing the novel "My Kinetic Name is a Butterfly", a novel addressed to young people that reached the list of the 100 most important books for young people in the world in 2012, and the novel was reprinted in both Arabic and English. Bsharat's career as professional writer began in 2005, although she had this talent since the primary stage in her school. She composed stories and drew a visual narrative parallel to the text, so she acquired both skills at a young age.

== Certifications and positions ==
She completed her secondary education and then joined the Faculty of Arts at An-Najah National University, where she obtained a BA and MA in Arabic literature from the same university and worked as a teacher for twelve years, then rose to become the director of the Children's Literature Department in the Palestinian Ministry of Culture.

== Early life and career ==
Ahlam Bsharat was born and grew up in a family working in the cultivation of the land. She dreamed of becoming a fashion designer, painter, or farmer, but she became a writer, and this was not easy. She is still tormented and enjoys words, and weather conditions, such as fields, hills, and small valleys. The villages of Jiftlik and Tammun. Her family lived in Tammun while her school and the family farm were in Jiftlik. So, this daily trip painted the imaginations of the girl Ahlam, who lived her school life in parallel with her active role in agricultural life with the family of ten. She did not find good news in the reality of her childhood as entertainment. Her imagination is a haven, which she translated into writings and drawings in expression classes in the sixth grade. It was her first attempt to write a story that coincided with the beginning of the first intifada and reflects the girl's ideas about the events in her surroundings. She began her career in writing for young people in addition to writing fiction and poetry, since "My Kinetic Name is a Butterfly" (2009), through "Trees for Absentee People" (2013) and "Ginger" (2017) until "The Memories Factory". Ahlam establishes a writing that starts from Palestine, from her questions and reality, to reach her question sometimes to a different picture of reality to embrace it again.

== Books ==
Title	Language	Publisher	Year	Pages	ISBN	OCLC Number
Trees for Absentee People	Arabic	Tamer Company	2013	62	ISBN 9789950260146, 9950260140	891793798
Poinciana Tree; Diary of a girl from the lowest point in the world	Arabic	Tamer Company	2014	85	ISBN 9789950260801, 9950260809	986391813
If I have them.. they are just thoughts	Arabic	شمس للنشر والتوزيع، al-Muqaṭṭam, al-Qāhirah : Shams lil-Nashr wa-al-Tawzīʻ,.	2009	153	ISBN 9789779430041, 9779430040	562000520
My Kinetic Name is a Butterfly	Arabic English	Tamer Company نيم تري برس	2009	97	ISBN 9789950326477, 9950326478	646916900
The Memories Factory	Arabic	Alsalwa	2018	128	ISBN 9789957041366	1294310752
Blue Eulogies	Arabic	دار فضاءات، ʻAmmān : Dār Faḍāʼāt	2010	181	ISBN 9789957301163	589227333
Ginger	Arabic	Tamer Company	2017	87	ISBN 9789950260948, 9950260949	993159227
Because I love you	Arabic	Ugarit Cultural Center	2005	90		277040688
Grandpa Bed	Arabic	Tamer Company	2018		ISBN 9789950270190, 9950270197	1091841367
Diwan of the name of the bird	Arabic	Alraqameyah	2021	166		
Princess Bahraj Palace	Arabic	Palastine Workshop	2016	24	ISBN 9789950851634, 9950851637	1158755037
Mary, the lady of the astrolabe	Arabic	Alraqameyah	2018	36	ISBN 978-9950-8522-0-4	
How did the secret come back?	Arabic	Everything Library				993200025
Color of The House	Arabic	Everything Library			ISBN 9789657652534, 9657652537	951794058
The boy is searching for his name	Arabic	Badeel				495751876
Nani delivers cakes: a story for children	Arabic	Ugarit Cultural Center				827867413
Alzinko Window	Arabic	Badeel			ISBN 9789950339149, 9950339146	495751447
The Palestinian in His Isolation, a Woodpecker for His Life Tree	Arabic	Journal of Palestine Studies, n123 (2020): 160 - 164				9503472053
