= Ibn Zuraiq al-Baghdadi =

Iraqi poet

Abu al-Hasan Ali Abu Abdullah ibn Zuraiq al-Baghdadi (Arabic: أبو الحسن علي أبو عبد الله بن زريق البغدادي; died 420 AH/1029 AD) was an Iraqi poet active in al-Andalus.

Born in Baghdad, Ibn Zuraiq grew up in the Abbasid Caliphate. Little is known about his early life, but he gained recognition for his poetic talent. Faced with economic hardship, Ibn Zuraiq left his homeland in pursuit of better opportunities in al-Andalus, seeking prosperity through his poetic endeavors. He died of an unknown illness around 1029. According to accounts, a single poem was discovered with his body.

Ibn Zuraiq's poetry reflected themes of love, longing, and the human condition. His verses were characterized by their elegance, depth, and emotional resonance, garnering admiration from contemporaries and subsequent generations of poets. Ibn Zuraiq's poetry continued to resonate with audiences long after his death. His Qaṣīda al-Andalusiyya was praised by Ibn Hazm "as a means of achieving perfect elegance if memorized". An example of his poetry is this short encomium on Baghdad, "Baghdad's People":

I have traveled far to find a parallel for Baghdad
and her people—my task was second to despair.

Alas, for me Baghdad is the entire world,
her people—the only genuine ones.

The Bahraini author Ahmad Al Dosari has written a historical novel based on the life of Ibn Zuraiq, entitled Ibn Zuraiq Al Baghdadi: A Passenger of Time.

== See also ==
- List of Arabic-language poets
