= Yahya ibn Ali al-Tanukhi =

Syrian chronicler

Yaḥyā ibn ʿAlī al-Tanūkhī (5 March 1051 – c. 1105), called Ibn Zurayq, was a Syrian chronicler.

Ibn Zurayq was born in Maʿarrat al-Nuʿmān. He played a role in the First Crusades. He probably died in the first decade of the 12th century, although Bernard Lewis places his death after 1115.

Ibn Zurayq wrote a lost chronicle (tārīkh) covering Seljuk rule in Syria and the First Crusades. Only a few extracts are preserved through Ibn al-ʿAdīm via al-ʿUlaymī. These provide information on Alp Arslan's campaign against Aleppo and the relationship between Khalaf ibn Mulāʿib and Aq Sunqur.

== Bibliography ==
- Lewis, Bernard (1952). "The Sources for the History of the Syrian Assassins". Speculum. 27 (4): 475–489. doi:10.2307/2850476. JSTOR 2850476.
- Runciman, Steven (1951). A History of the Crusades, Volume I: The First Crusade and the Foundation of the Kingdom of Jerusalem. Vol. 1. Cambridge: Cambridge University Press.
- Zakkar, Suheil (1969). The Emirate of Aleppo, 392/1002–487/1094 (PDF) (PhD dissertation). University of London, School of Oriental and African Studies.
