= Saltaneh =

Saltaneh (Persian: سلطنه) is a surname of Iranian origins, often associated with the Qajar dynasty. Due to transliteration of the name in English and because it is used with a prefix, variations of the name include al-Saltaneh, as-Saltaneh, es-Saltaneh, and ol-Saltaneh. People with this family name include:

== People with the surname Saltaneh ==
- Zohreh Etezad Saltaneh (born 1962) Iranian visual artist and teacher

=== al-Saltaneh ===
- Ahmad Moshir al-Saltaneh (1844–1918), Persian Prime Minister of Qajar-era Iran
- Ghavam al-Saltaneh (1873–1955), Iranian Prime Minister, served five terms
- Hossein Adib al-Saltaneh (1876–1954), also known as Hossein Sami'i, Iranian writer, poet, diplomat, and politician
- Najaf-Qoli Samsam al-Saltaneh (1846–1930), Iranian Prime Minister and a leader of the Persian Constitutional Revolution

=== as-Saltaneh ===
- Mohammad Bagher Sa'd as-Saltaneh, Iranian politician who served as the governor of the city of Qazvin

=== es-Saltaneh ===
- Kamran Mirza Nayeb es-Saltaneh (1856–1929), Persian Prince of the Qajar dynasty
- Zahra Khanom Tadj es-Saltaneh (1884–1936), Persian princess of the Qajar dynasty

=== ol-Saltaneh ===
- Mohammad-Ali Ala ol-Saltaneh (1829–1918), Persian Prime Minister of Qajar-era Iran
- Zia ol-Saltaneh (1799–1873), Persian calligrapher and poet

=== os-Saltaneh ===
- Ashraf os-Saltaneh (1863–1914), Persian princesses and photographer of the Qajar-era

== See also ==
- Persian name, overview of naming conventions
- Sa'd al-Saltaneh Caravanserai, a large Caravanserai located in the city of Qazvin, built during the Qajar-era
- Mahoor Scores by Mokhber-Al-Saltaneh, a 2011 book by Saman Pourisa
