= List of governors of Qazvin =

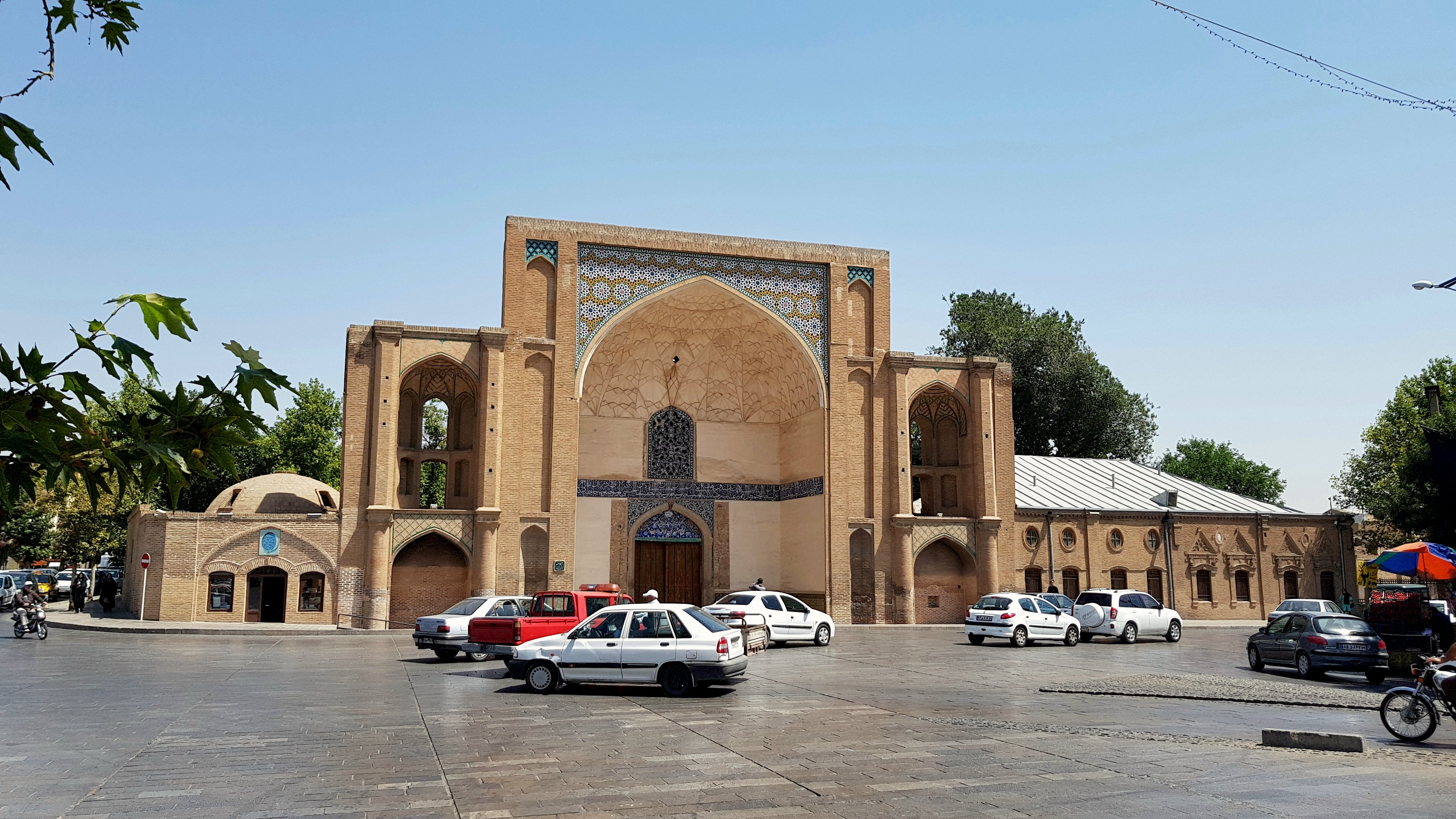
Entrance to the Safavid royal complex in Qazvin, where the governors of Qazvin were seated.

The office of the governor of Qazvin (Persian: حاکم قزوین) was a historical office whose holders were tasked with the governance of the city and region of Qazvin. The administrative unit of Qazvin included most of today's Qazvin province, sometimes including or excluding parts such as Taleqan, Alamut, Tarom, Soltaniyeh and Savojbolagh. The office was not hereditary and the governors were assigned directly by the Shah.

The governors of Qazvin were seated in the Safavid royal complex during Safavid dynasty and later governments.

The office was replaced with the Ostandar of Qazvin (Persian: استاندار قزوین) after the Qajar dynasty.

== Qajar dynasty ==
Note: Data in reference is given in Islamic calendar, and converting to the Gregorian calendar would have been inaccurate as years would correspond to two Gregorian calendar years. Thus, the dates are given in the Islamic calendar and an approximate Gregorian conversion is also given.

Portrait	Governor	In office (Lunar Hijri)	In office (Gregorian)	Vice governor	Notes	Shah
	Mirza Mohammad Khan Davalu Qajar	1200–1209 AH	1786–1794		Leader of the Davalu Branch of the Qajar tribe	Agha Mohammad Khan Qajar
	Mahdiqoli Khan Qovanlu Qajar	1209–? AH	1794–?			Agha Mohammad Khan Qajar
	Mohammad Ali Mirza Dowlatshah	1213–1221 AH	1798–1806		Fath-Ali Shah's eldest son	Fath-Ali Shah Qajar
	Ali Naqi Mirza	1222–1238 AH	1807–1822		Fath-Ali Shah's eighth son	Fath-Ali Shah Qajar
	Emamverdi Mirza Ilkhani	1238–1239 AH	1822–1823		Fath-Ali Shah's twelfth son	Fath-Ali Shah Qajar
	Ali Naqi Mirza	1239–1250 AH	1823–1834		Second time as governor of Qazvin	Fath-Ali Shah Qajar
	Shahrokh Khan	1252–1253 AH	1836–1837		Ebrahim Khan Zahir od-Dowleh's son	Mohammad Shah Qajar
	Hamzeh Mirza Heshmat od-Dowleh	1253–1255 AH	1837–1839		Abbas Mirza's twenty first son	Mohammad Shah Qajar
	Bahram Mirza	1256–1264 AH	1840–1847	Tahmasp Qoli Khan	Second son of Abbas Mirza	Mohammad Shah Qajar
	Bahram Mirza	1256–1264 AH	1840–1847	Tahmasp Qoli Khan	Second son of Abbas Mirza	Naser al-Din Shah Qajar
	Bahram Mirza	Bahram Mirza held the office of the governor of Qazvin at the time of Mohammad Shah's death and Naser al-Din Shah's coronation		Tahmasp Qoli Khan	Second son of Abbas Mirza	Naser al-Din Shah Qajar
	Eskandar Mirza	1264–1268 AH	1847–1851		Abbas Mirza's sixth son	Naser al-Din Shah Qajar
	Khosrow Khan Ardalan	1268–1271 AH	1851–1854		Son of Amanollah Khan Ardalan	Naser al-Din Shah Qajar
	Seyfollah Mirza	1271 AH	1854		Forty second child of Fath-Ali Shah	Naser al-Din Shah Qajar
	Abd as-Samad Mirza Ezzoddowleh*	1271–1277 AH	1854–1860	Hassanali Khan Khoey Ajudan Bashi	Third son of Mohammad Shah	Naser al-Din Shah Qajar
	Amir-Aslan Khan Majd od-Dowleh	1277–1278 AH	1860–1861		Naser al-Din Shah's maternal uncle	Naser al-Din Shah Qajar
	Mohammad Taqi Mirza Rokn ed-Dowleh	1278–1282 AH	1861–1865		Mohammad Shah's fourth son	Naser al-Din Shah Qajar
	Soltan Ahmad Mirza Azod od-Dowleh	1282–1284 AH	1865–1867		Forty eighth son of Fath-Ali Shah	Naser al-Din Shah Qajar
	Firuz Mirza Nosrat ad-Dowleh	1284-? AH	1267-?		Sixteenth son of Abbas Mirza	Naser al-Din Shah Qajar
	Mohammad Rahim Khan Ala ad-Dowleh	?-1288 AH	?-1271			Naser al-Din Shah Qajar
	Qolamhossein Khan Sepahdar	1288–1289 AH	1871–1872		Son of Yusef Khan-e Gorji	Naser al-Din Shah Qajar
	Allahqoli Khan Ilkhani	1289–1292 AH	1872–1875		Grandson of Fath-Ali Shah	Naser al-Din Shah Qajar
	Soltan Ahmad Mirza Azod ad-Dowleh	1292–1297 AH	1875–1879		Second time as governor of Qazvin	Naser al-Din Shah Qajar
	Mirza Hosein Khan Sepahsalar	1297–1298 AH	1879–1880			Naser al-Din Shah Qajar
	Abbas Mirza Molk-Ara	1298–1301 AH	1880–1883		Son of Mohammad Shah	Naser al-Din Shah Qajar
	Mirza Reza Moein as-Saltaneh	1301–1302 AH	1883–1884			Naser al-Din Shah Qajar
	Mirza Yahya Khan Moshir od-Dowleh	1302–1304 AH	1884–1886		Brother of Mirza Hosein Khan Sepahsalar	Naser al-Din Shah Qajar
	Hossein Khan Mo'tamed al-Molk Yahyaiian	1304–1305 AH	1886–1887		Son of Mirza Yahya Khan Moshir od-Dowleh	Naser al-Din Shah Qajar
	Allahqoli Khan Ilkhani	1305–1306 AH	1887–1888	Mohammad Bagher Sa'd as-Saltaneh	Second time as governor of Qazvin	Naser al-Din Shah Qajar
	Mohammad Bagher Sa'd as-Saltaneh	1306–1309 AH	1888–1891		Cousin of Mirza Ali Asghar Khan Amin al-Soltan	Naser al-Din Shah Qajar
	Abunasr Mirza Hesam as-Saltaneh	1309–1310 AH	1891–1892		Son of Soltan Morad Mirza Hesam as-Saltaneh	Naser al-Din Shah Qajar
	Mohammad Bagher Sa'd as-Saltaneh	1310–1314 AH	1892–1896		Second time as governor of Qazvin	Naser al-Din Shah Qajar
	Mohammad Bagher Sa'd as-Saltaneh	Sa'd as-Saltaneh held the office of the governor of Qazvin at the time of Naser al-Din Shah's death and Mozaffar ad-Din Shah's coronation			Second time as governor of Qazvin	Mozaffar ad-Din Shah Qajar
	Abd as-Samad Mirza Ezzoddowleh	1314–1315 AH	1896–1897	Qahraman Mirza Ein as-Saltaneh	Third time as governor of Qazvin.^{*}	Mozaffar ad-Din Shah Qajar
	Sedgh ad-Dowleh	1315–1316 AH	1897–1898			Mozaffar ad-Din Shah Qajar
	Badi al-Molk Mirza Emad ad-Dowleh	1316–1319 AH	1898–1901		Grandson of Dowlatshah	Mozaffar ad-Din Shah Qajar
	Soltan Mohammad Mirza Seif ad-Dowleh	1319–1320 AH	1901–1902		Son of Soltan Ahmad Mirza Azod od-Dowleh	Mozaffar ad-Din Shah Qajar
	Mirza Saleh Asef ad-Dowleh	1320–1324 AH	1902–1906		Last governor before the constitutional revolution	Mozaffar ad-Din Shah Qajar
	Sedgh ad-Dowleh	1324–1325 AH	1906–1907		Second time as the governor of Qazvin	Mohammad Ali Shah Qajar
	Amid al-Molk	1325–1326 AH	1907–1908		Son of Amjad ad-Dowleh	Mohammad Ali Shah Qajar
	Amjad ad-Dowleh	1326–1327 AH	1908–1909		First governor of Qazvin during the Minor Tyranny	Mohammad Ali Shah Qajar
	Abolqasem Nuri	1327 AH	1909		Last governor of Qazvin during the Minor Tyranny	Mohammad Ali Shah Qajar
	Sedgh ad-Dowleh	1327–1328 AH	1909–1910		Third time as the governor of Qazvin	Ahmad Shah Qajar
	Mirza Saeed Khan Moshir as-Soltan	1328 AH	1910	Soltan Ahmad Khan Rad		Ahmad Shah Qajar
	Taqi Ehtesab al-Molk	1328–1329 AH	1910–1911			Ahmad Shah Qajar
	Sardar Homayun Gilani Modir al-Molk	1329 AH	1911			Ahmad Shah Qajar
	Zia ad-Dowleh	1329–1332 AH	1911–1913			Ahmad Shah Qajar
	Ebrahim Khan Mo'tamed as-Saltaneh	1332–1333 AH	1913–1914			Ahmad Shah Qajar
	Mirza Hassan Khan Madhat as-Saltaneh	1333–1337 AH	1914–1918		Member of the third parliament	Ahmad Shah Qajar
	Amir Aslan Khan Nezam as-Soltan	1337–1338 AH	1918–1919			Ahmad Shah Qajar
	Moaffagh ad-Dowleh Nuri	1338–1339 AH	1919–1921		Last governor of Qazvin before the 1921 Iranian coup d'état	Ahmad Shah Qajar

*He was briefly demoted during his first time as governor of Qazvin
