= Mohammad Bagher Sa'd as-Saltaneh =

Iranian politician

Bagher Khan Sa'd as-Saltaneh Esfahani
- باقرخان سعدالسلطنه اصفهانی
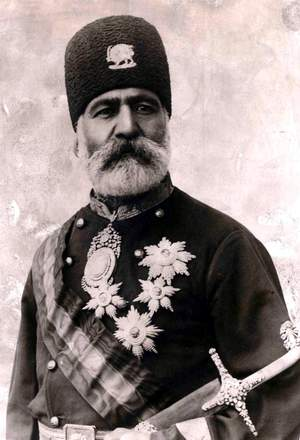

Governor of Qazvin
- In office 1888 – 1891 (or 1892)
- Preceded by: Allah Qoli Mirza Ilkhani
- Succeeded by: Hesam as-Saltaneh

Governor of Qazvin
- In office 1892–1896
- Preceded by: Hesam as-Saltaneh
- Succeeded by: Abdolsamad Mirza Ezz ad-Dowleh

Governor of Gilan and Talish
- In office February 1898 – 1 March 1899
- Succeeded by: Mohammad Vali Khan Nasr as-Saltaneh

Governor of Ardabil and Meshginshahr
- In office August 1903 – Unknown

Governor of Khalkhal
- In office January 1904 – Unknown

Governor of Zanjan
- In office January 1908 – His death

Personal details
- Born: c. 1829–c. 1839 Isfahan, Qajar Iran
- Died: 30 June or 1 July 1908 Qerveh, Zanjan, Qajar Iran
- Resting place: Fatima Masumeh Shrine, Qom
- Children: Abdolali Khan; Qamar Khanom; Hajiye Khanom

Bagher Khan Sa'd as-Saltaneh Esfahani (Persian: باقرخان سعدالسلطنه اصفهانی) was an Iranian politician who served as the governor of various cities and provinces during the reigns of Naser al-Din Shah Qajar and Mozaffar ad-Din Shah Qajar.

Despite being illiterate and of humble origins, his time as the governor of Qazvin is mostly remembered as that of the city's rejuvenation, as he ordered the repair of many buildings in the city and renovated the infrastructure. He also ordered the construction of the Sa'd al-Saltaneh caravanserai.

He was later appointed as the governor of Gilan, Ardabil, Khalkhal and ultimately Zanjan, where he was wounded in a fight and died on the way to Tehran. He is buried in Qom, near the Fatima Masumeh Shrine.

== Life ==
He was born sometime between 1829 and 1839 in Isfahan or according to a source, Qom. He was a relative of Ebrahim Khan Amin as-Soltan. Due to his connections to Amin as-Soltan, he became a servant of Naser al-Din Shah. He was among the Shah's companions during his first travel to Europe, serving as a cook and cupbearer, traveling in the same ship that the Shah did.

=== Construction projects ===
After returning from his second travel to Europe, Naser al-Din Shah, intending to construct a road between Tehran and Azerbaijan, ordered the construction of a road between Tehran and Qazvin, giving the task to Ebrahim Khan Amin as-Soltan and Amin al-Molk. After a short while however, Amin al-Molk resigned from the task, leaving Amin as-Soltan as the one to construct the road. Amin as-Soltan then appointed Bagher Khan to oversee the construction of the road using 180 workers. The construction was completed after around a year in June 1879, and Bagher Khan was given the duty of maintaining the road, a role he held until 1896.

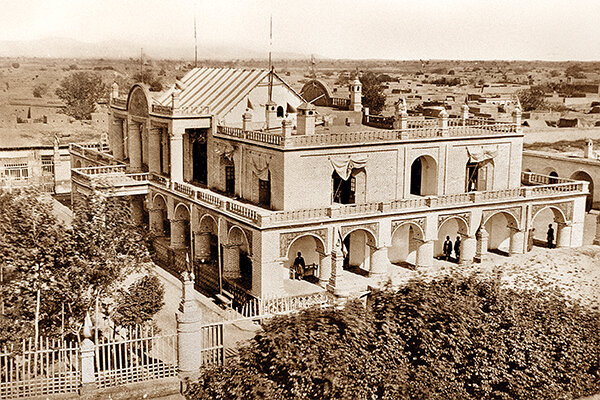
The grand inn of Qazvin

Due to being on the way to the capital, Qazvin was visited frequently by foreign envoys and merchants, and as a result, was in need of a place to accommodate them. The Shah ordered the construction of the Grand Inn of Qazvin (Persian: مهمانخانه بزرگ قزوین) to Amin as-Soltan in August 1878, and its construction was carried out by Bagher Khan who was appointed by Amin as-Soltan. The construction was completed by 1880. This building was located in front of the Ali Qapu gate and to the east of the Jameh Mosque of Qazvin, and was at the time the most well-equipped and prestigious inn in Iran. The inn's management was given to Bagher Khan, who paid a part of the inn's annual revenue to the government. The grand inn of Qazvin was demolished in 1929 to make way for streets that were being rapidly constructed to redesign and modernise the city.

Bagher Khan later managed the construction of a road from Tehran to Qom. After the construction of the Tehran-Qazvin road, Ebrahim Khan Amin as-Soltan began the construction of a road from Tehran to Qom in 1881, but he couldn't finish it due to his death in the summer of the year 1883. His son, Mirza Ali Asghar Khan Amin al-Soltan, finished constructing the road in 1884.

=== Vice governor of Qazvin ===
Bagher Khan was given the office of the vice governor of Qazvin by Allah Qoli Mirza Ilkhani, who was assigned as the governor of Qazvin for the second time in early 1888. Since Ilkhani spent most of his time at the court in Tehran, Bagher Khan, who was already a man of great influence in Qazvin was appointed by him as the vice governor.

His actions during his time as the vice governor of Qazvin include repairing the city's governmental buildings such as Chehel Sotun, Ali Qapu Gate, Rokniye and the Naderi Palace. He also arrested bandits from the Zargari tribe, which he exiled to Ardabil.

Bagher Khan was appointed as the governor of Qazvin for the first time in 1888, replacing Allah Qoli Mirza Ilkhani. He was given the title of Sa'd as-Saltaneh (Persian: سعدالسلطنه, lit. 'Fortune of the kingdom') by Naser al-Din Shah on 19 April 1889.

During his time as the governor of Qazvin, Sa'd as-Saltaneh ordered the construction of a Rakhtshui Khaneh, which was a roofed building designed for women to do their laundry. The building was constructed near the Ali Qapu Gate. This building no longer exists, but a similar structure exists in Zanjan, named similarly Rakhtshui Khaneh.

==== Accompanying Shah's wife to Europe ====
Sa'd as-Saltaneh traveled to Europe twice in his lifetime; the first time he traveled to Europe as a servant of the Shah, and the second time accompanied the Shah's wife, Zobeide Garusi, to Europe. Nicknamed Amin Aqdas, she was one of the Shah's favorite wives and at the time had an eye disease that had made her completely blind. The Shah decided to send her to Europe for medical care, and Sa'd as-Saltaneh, being familiar with European manners since his first travel to Europe, was chosen to accompany her to Vienna. The travel took 70 days and was unsuccessful. Amin Aqdas was the first woman of the royal court to travel to Europe, and this drew some criticism from the clergy. While away, Qazvin was governed by Sa'd as-Saltaneh's son, Abdolali Khan, who was appointed as Qazvin's vice governor.

==== Political prisoners ====
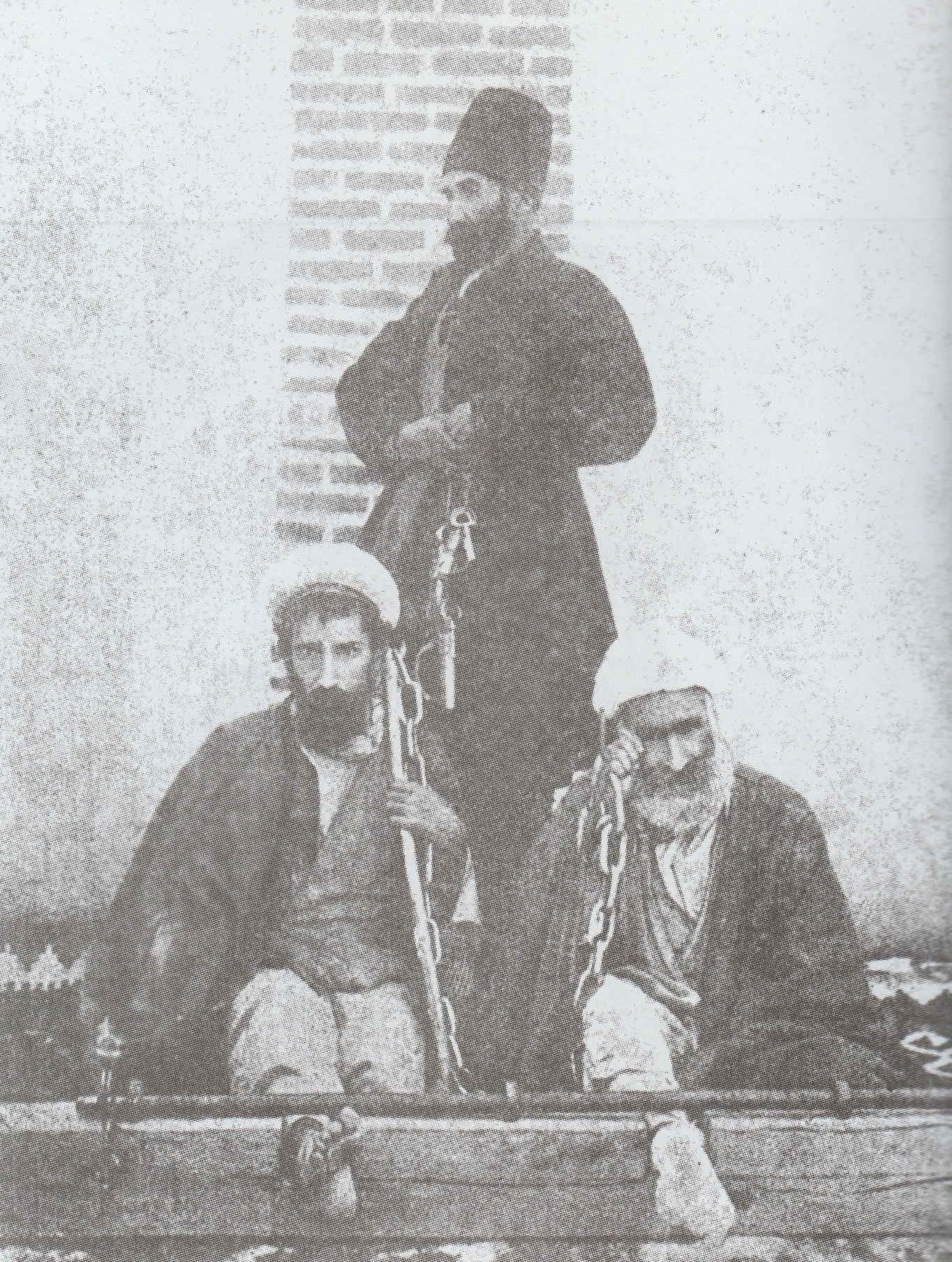
Haj Sayyah and Mirza Reza Kermani in prison in Qazvin, during Sa'd as-Saltaneh's time as the city's governor.

Eight political dissidents were sent to be imprisoned in Qazvin during Sa'd as-Saltaneh's time as the governor of Qazvin. These included prominent figures such as Hajj Sayyah and Mirza Reza Kermani, and lesser-known figures named Hajj Mirza Ahmad Kermani, Mirza Abdollah Hakim, Mirza Heydarali Zarduz, Mirza Farajollah Khan, Mirza Mohammad Ali Khan, and Mirza Nasrollah Khan. Two Bábi men named Molla Ali Akbar Shahmirzadi and Haji Abolhasan were also arrested by Kamran Mirza to make it seem that the prisoners are not political activists concerned with freedom but rather heretical Babis, arrested on religious grounds.

==== Tobacco Protests, demotion, and subsequent promotion to the governor of Qazvin ====
Social unrest resulting by the Regie concession in Tehran soon spread to Qazvin with people taking sanctuary in Imamzadeh Hossein. This resulted in Sa'd as-Saltaneh's demotion and replacement with Hesam as-Saltaneh, son of Soltan Morad Mirza. Hesam as-Saltaneh's time as governor did not last long, and he was demoted around 9 months later and Sa'd as-Saltaneh was put back in place as the governor in 1892.

On 24 November 1896, Sa'd as-Saltaneh was replaced by Ezz ed-Dowleh as the governor of Qazvin.

=== Government appointments from 1898 ===
Sa'd as-Saltaneh was appointed as the governor of Gilan and Talysh by Shoa as-Saltaneh in February 1898, but was removed from office on 1 March 1899 due to a conflict with a local clergyman.

According to Hossein-Qoli Nezam al-Saltaneh Mafi, Sa'd as-Saltaneh was appointed as the governor of Ardabil and Meshkinshahr in summer 1903 by the crown prince Mohammad Ali Mirza. Four and half months later, the governorship of Khalkhal was also given to him. It is not clear how long Sa'd as-Saltaneh was the governor of these areas, it is only clear that he was not the governor on 25 March 1905.

Sa'd as-Saltaneh replaced Jalal ad-Dowleh as the governor of Zanjan in January 1908.

== Death ==
During his time as the governor of Qazvin, he spent most of his time in conflict with Molla Qorbanali Zanjani, an influential local clergyman. In one such conflict, Sa'd as-Saltaneh was beaten and forced out of the city. He died of his wounds on 30 June or 1 July 1908 in Qerveh, Zanjan and was buried in the Fatima Masumeh Shrine.
