= Chehel Sotun, Qazvin =

Royal pavilion in Qazvin, Iran

Coordinates: 36°16′06″N 50°00′18″E

Chehelsotun
- چهلستون (Persian); عمارت کلاه فرنگی (Persian)
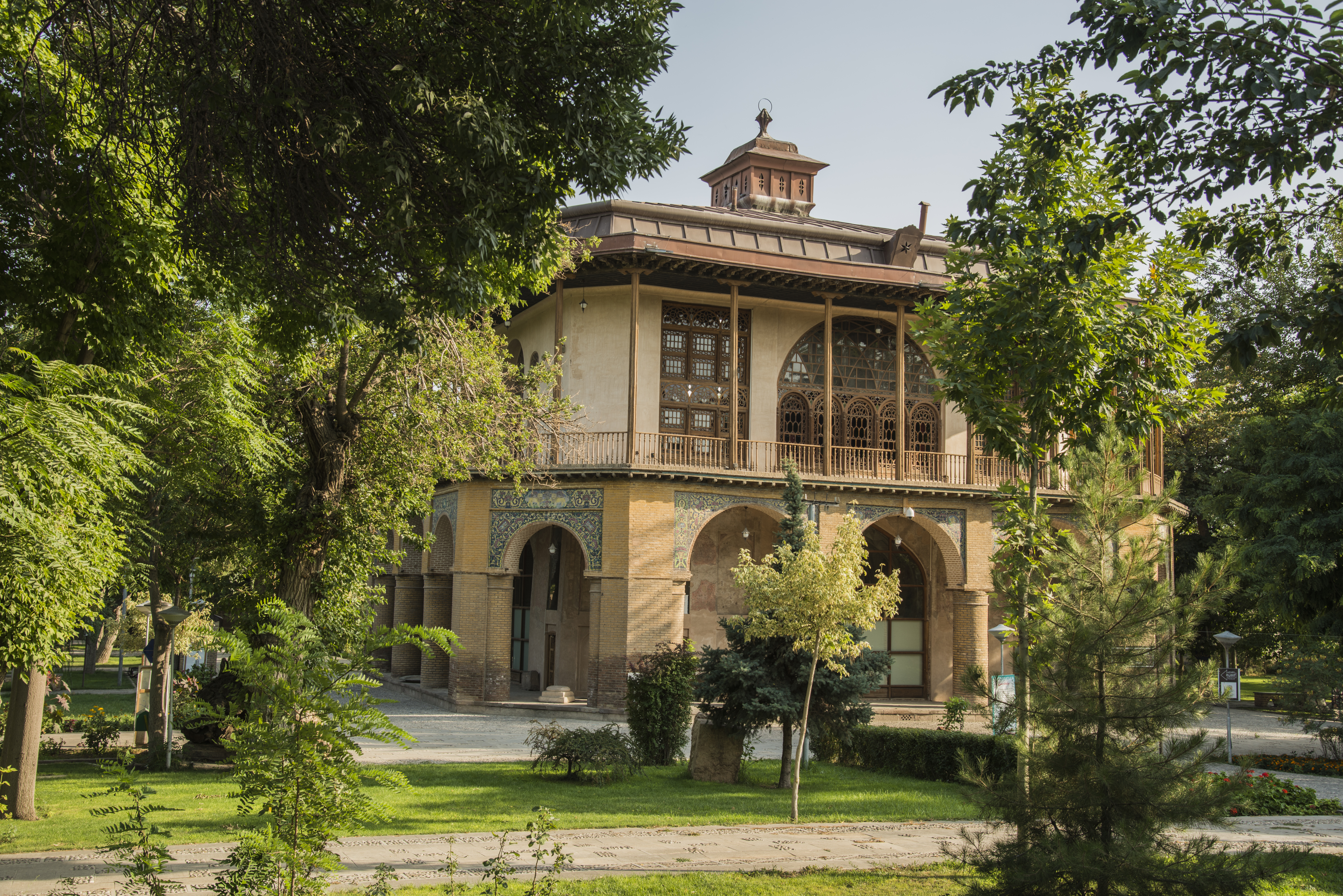
- Interactive map of Chehelsotun

History
- Built: 16th century
- Built for: Tahmasp I

Site notes
- Restored: 19th century
- Restored by: Mohammad Bagher Sa'd as-Saltaneh

Iran National Heritage List
- Official name: Chehel Sotoun Palace
- Type: Palace
- Designated: 1955
- Reference no.: 389
- Conservation organization: Cultural Heritage, Handicrafts and Tourism Organization of Iran

Chehel Sotun (Persian: چهلستون, lit. 'Forty columns'), originally named Kolah Farangi Mansion (Persian: عمارت کلاه فرنگی, lit. 'European hat mansion') is a Safavid era royal pavilion located in Qazvin, Iran.

Its construction is attributed to Tahmasp I, who transferred the capital of Iran from Tabriz to Qazvin in 1555–56. In the Qajar era, it was repaired and remodeled by Mohammad Bagher Sa'd as-Saltaneh, the governor of Qazvin.

Today, it is one of the two remaining Safavid royal structures in the city, the other one being the Ali Qapu Gate, and it is used as a museum of calligraphy.

== Gallery ==
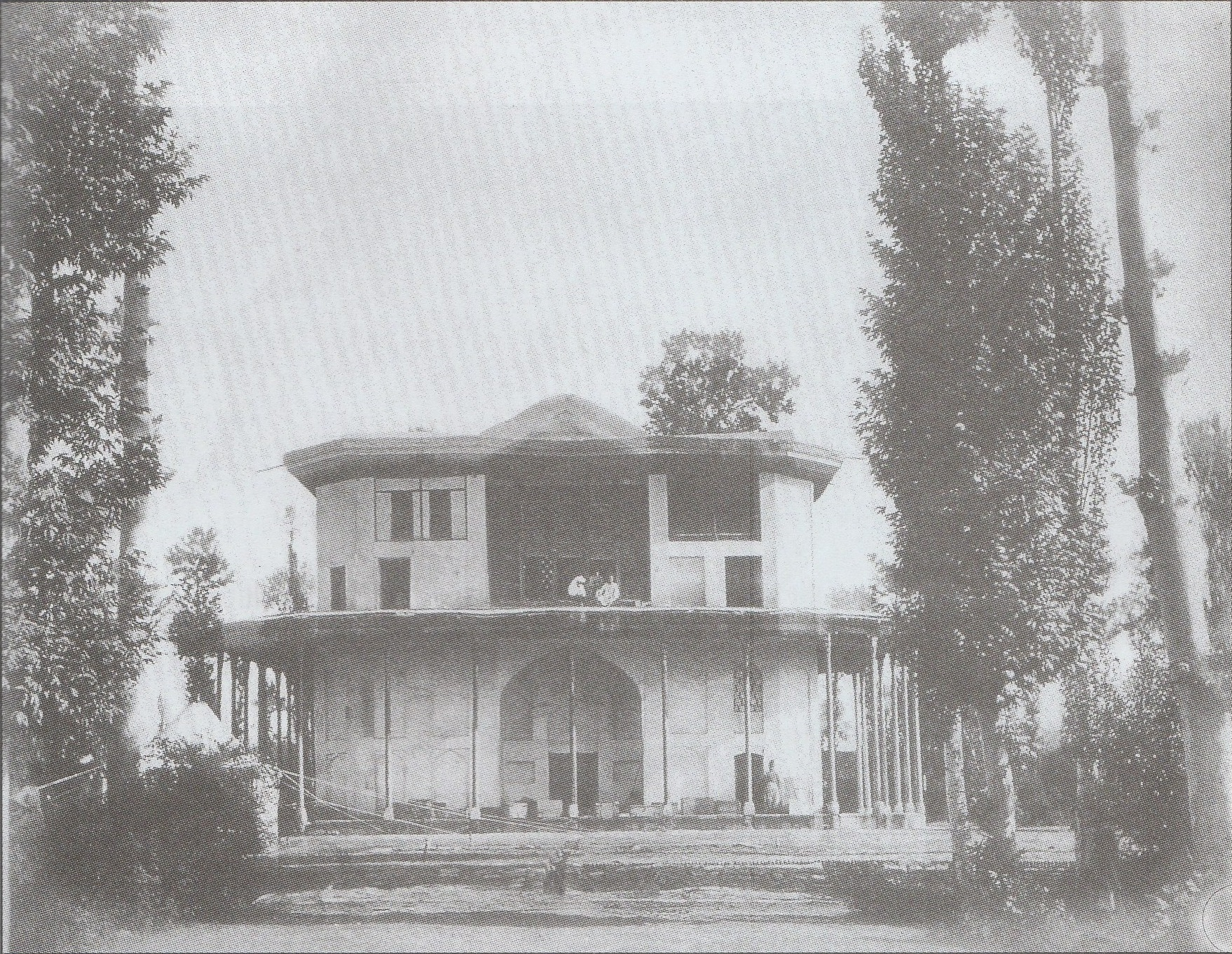
Photograph of the structure before renovations by Sa'd as-Saltaneh, 1862

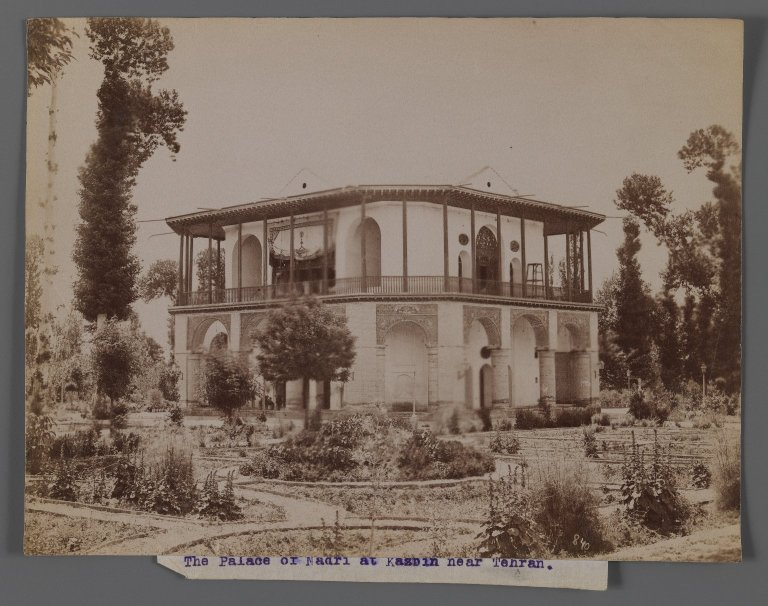
Photograph taken between 1876 and 1925

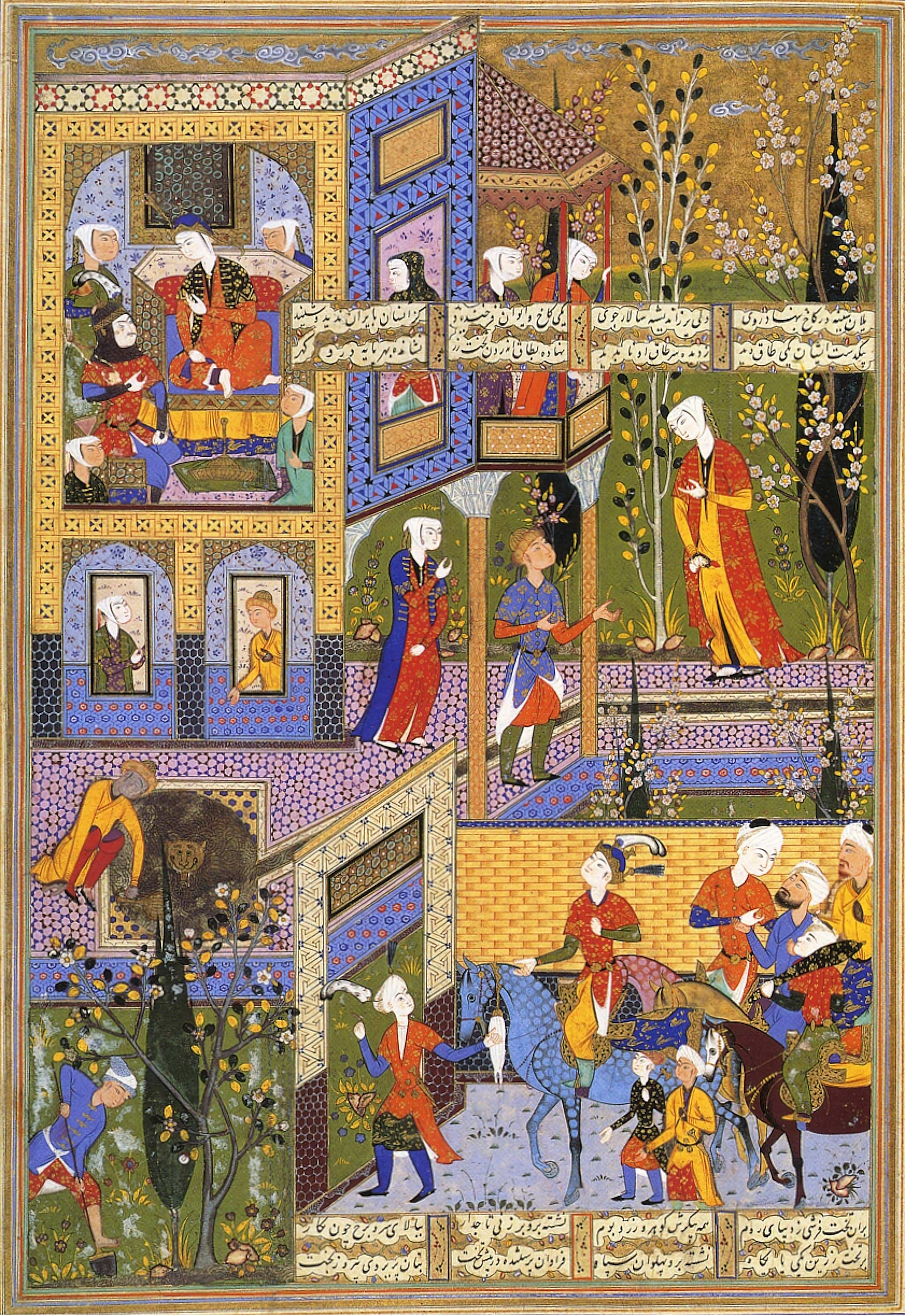
Likely depiction of the Chehel Sotun in a 1585 Shahnameh.

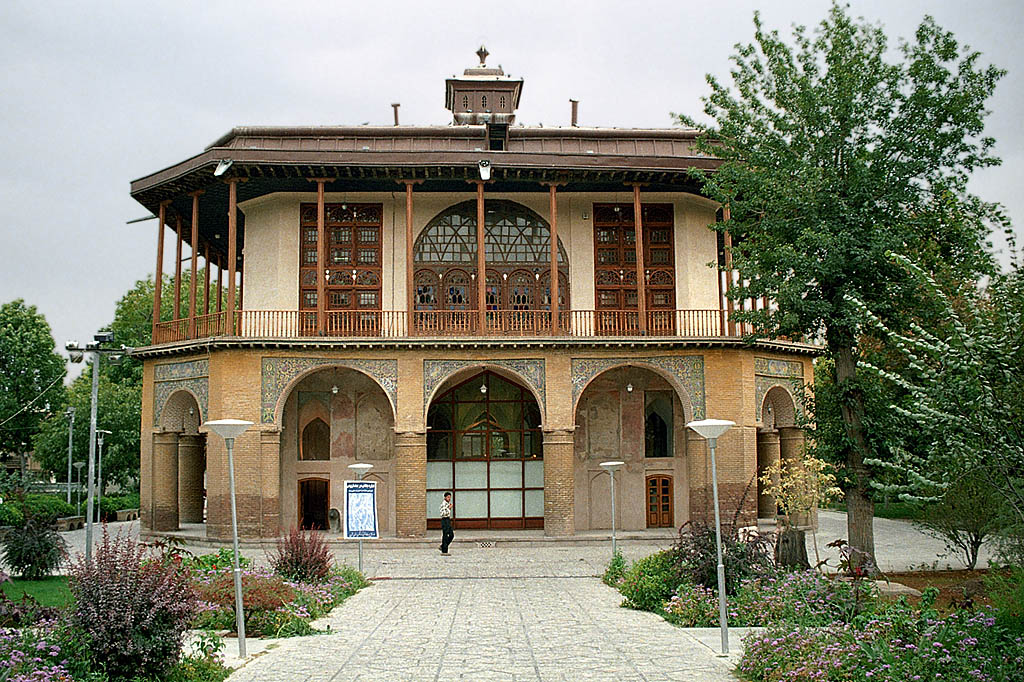
Exterior view

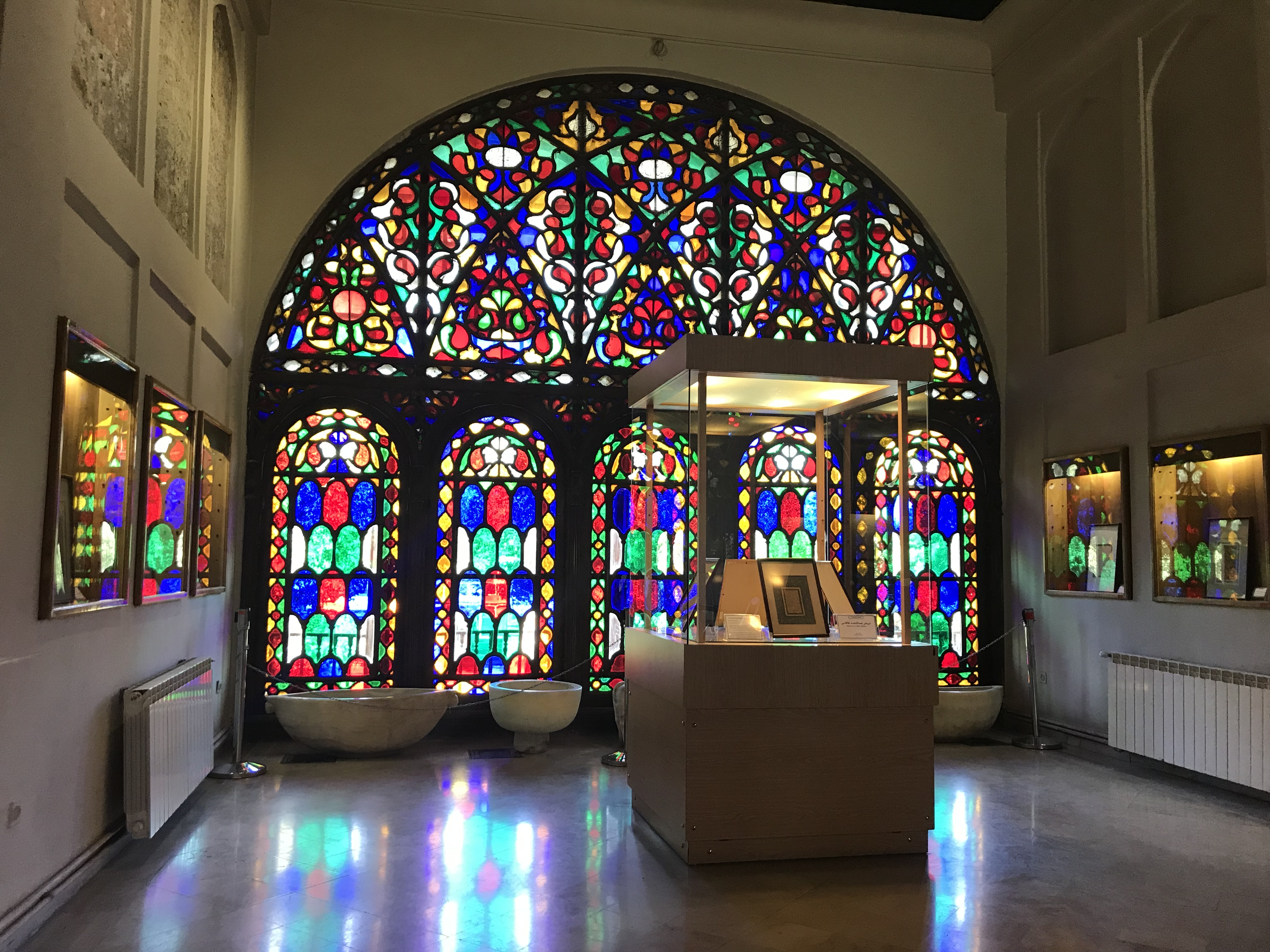
Interior view

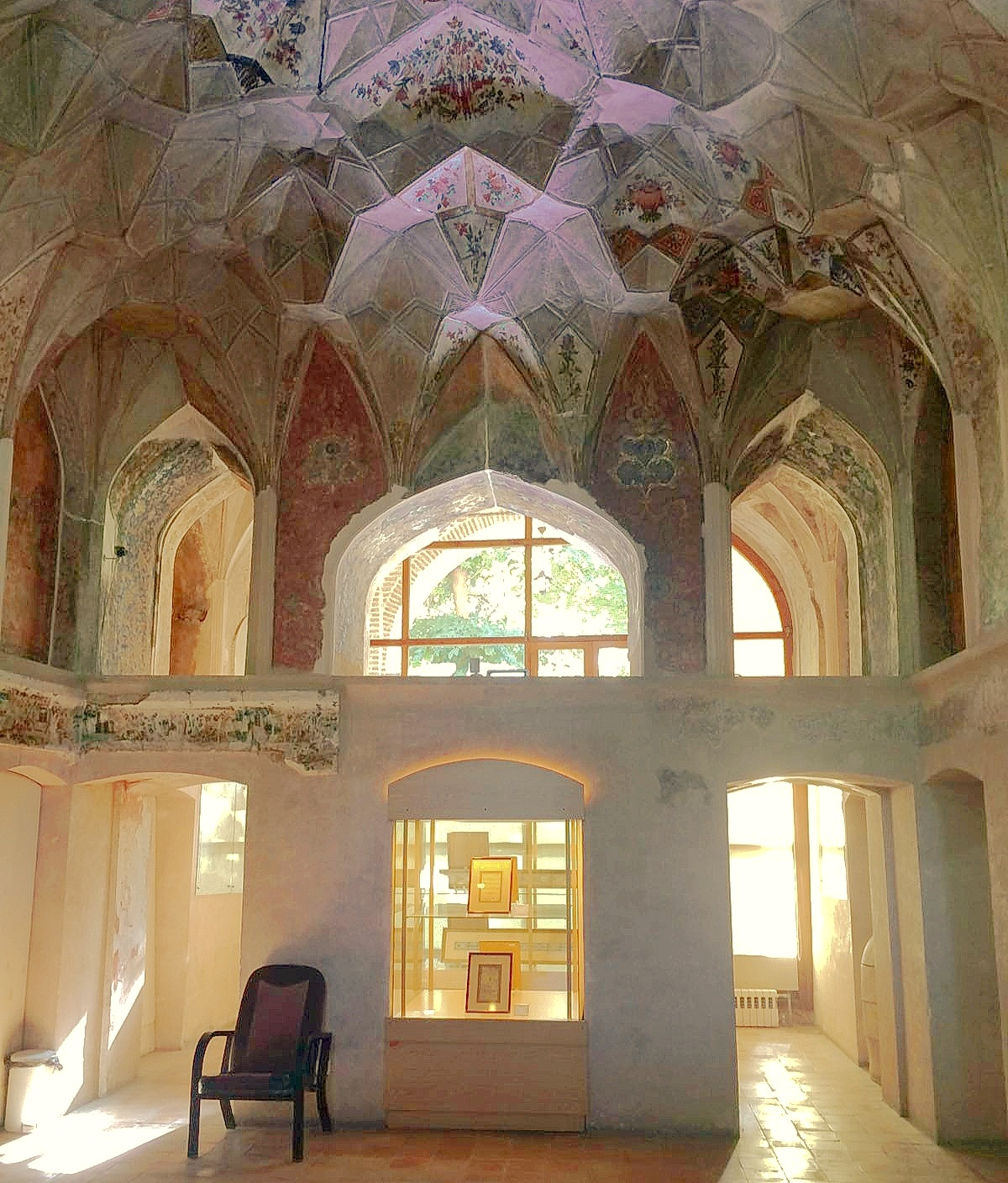
Interior view
