= Mahoor Scores by Mokhber-Al-Saltaneh =

Mahoor Scores By Mokhber-Al-Saltaneh
- Author: Saman Pourisa
- Cover artist: Mahshid Asoude khah (design)
- Language: Persian
- Subject: Art
- Genre: Research
- Published: 2011 Matn Publication
- Publication place: Iran
- Media type: Print
- Pages: 198
- ISBN: 978-964-232-112-4

Mahoor Scores By Mokhber-Al-Saltaneh is a book by Saman Pourisa about an old notation of Persian Music. It was published in 2011 by Iranian Academy of Arts. The title of the book is inspired of the name of the original writer of the notation Mehdi Qoli Hedayat (Mokhber-Al-Saltaneh). It consists of 5 chapters, and was nominated for the Winter 2012 Iran's season National Book award.

== Background ==
Persian (Iranian) music had been merely handed down orally from one generation to the next, and the Abjad system of notation had only been used in musical theories, not for practical use. Modern staff notation entered Iran in about 1850AD. After that, some Iranian musicians tried to write the radif of Persian music using this method. Among those musicians, two of them managed to write a comprehensive notation. The first one was Alinaghi Vaziri, but his recordings have been lost. The second one which is actually the first preserved comprehensive notation of the radif was written by Mehdi Qoli Hedayat known as Mokhber-Al-Saltaneh.
