= Sa'd al-Saltaneh Caravanserai =

UNESCO World Heritage Site in Iran

- کاروانسرای سعد السلطنه (Persian)
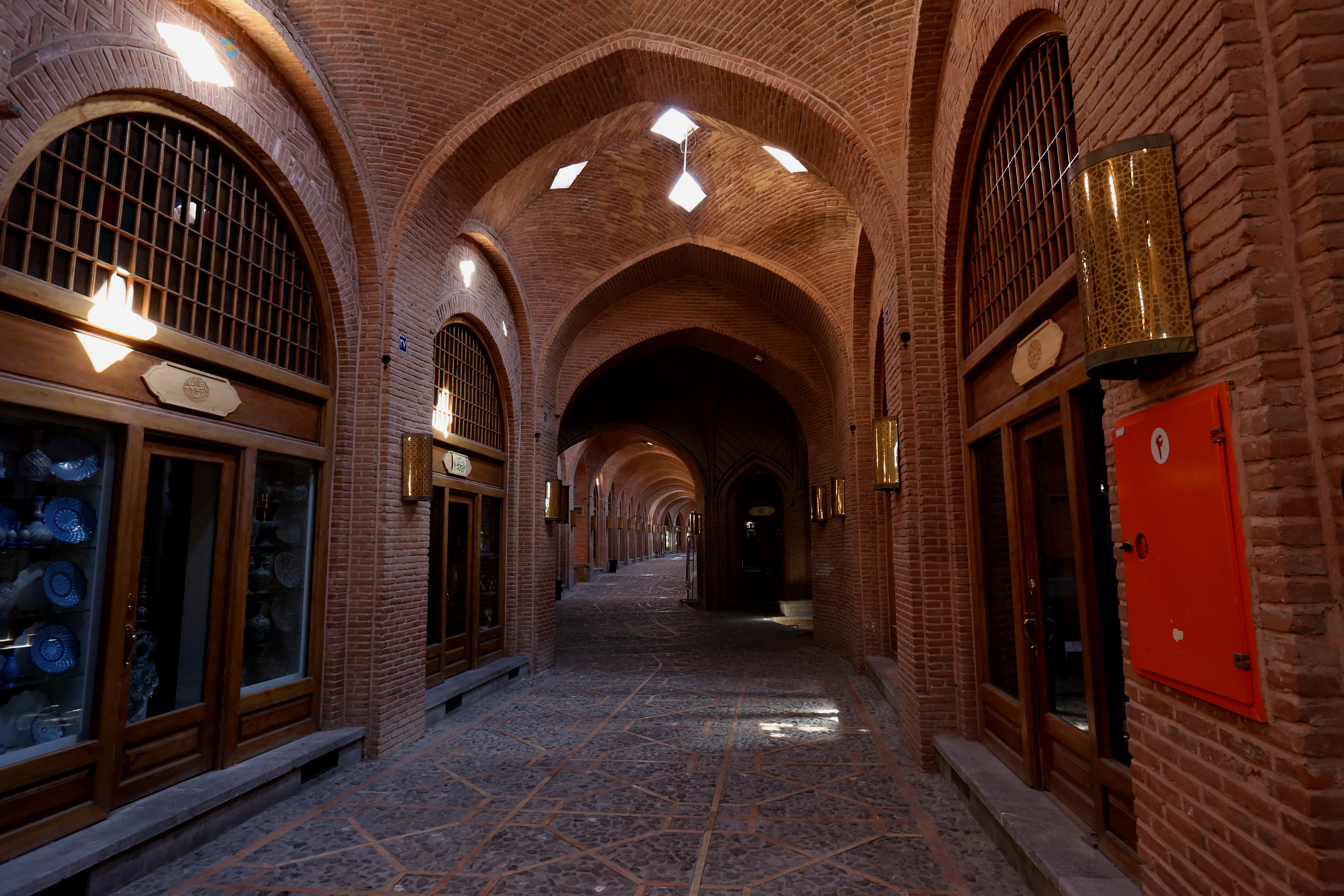
- Interactive map of Sa'd al-Saltaneh Caravanserai
- Periods: Qajar era

History
- Built: 1848–1896
- Built by: Mohammad Bagher Sa'd as-Saltaneh

Site notes
- Architectural style: Iranian
- Public access: Open

UNESCO World Heritage Site
- Type: Cultural
- Criteria: i, iii
- Designated: 2023
- Part of: The Persian Caravanserai
- Reference no.: 1668-054

The Sa'd al-Saltaneh Caravanserai (Persian: کاروانسرای سعدالسلطنه) is a large Caravanserai located in the city of Qazvin, Qazvin province, Iran. Built during the Qajar era, the caravanserai is one of Iran's best preserved urban caravanserais, and the world's largest indoor caravanserai.

The builder (patron) of this large caravanserai is Sa'd al-Saltaneh, the ruler of Qazvin during the Qajar era. With an area of 6.2 hectares, the caravanserai is built on a square plan, has 4 iwans facing a courtyard. The interiors are decorated with Muqarnas.

The Hujrehs, or the rooms for the travelers, are situated one meter above the courtyard ground level. The Hashti behind the southern iwan has the largest gonbad, with 4 semi-domes adjacent to it.

The eastern-western axis of the Hashti is called Dalan-e Qeisariyeh (دالان قيصريه ) or "Caesar's Hall", and the north–south axis of the Caravanserai's Hashti is named Dalan-e Ghahremani (دالان قهرماني) or "Ghahremani Hall". The former is connected to the "Bazaar of Vizir" of the city.

There are also two smaller courtyards in the east and west of the Caravanserai.

== Gallery ==
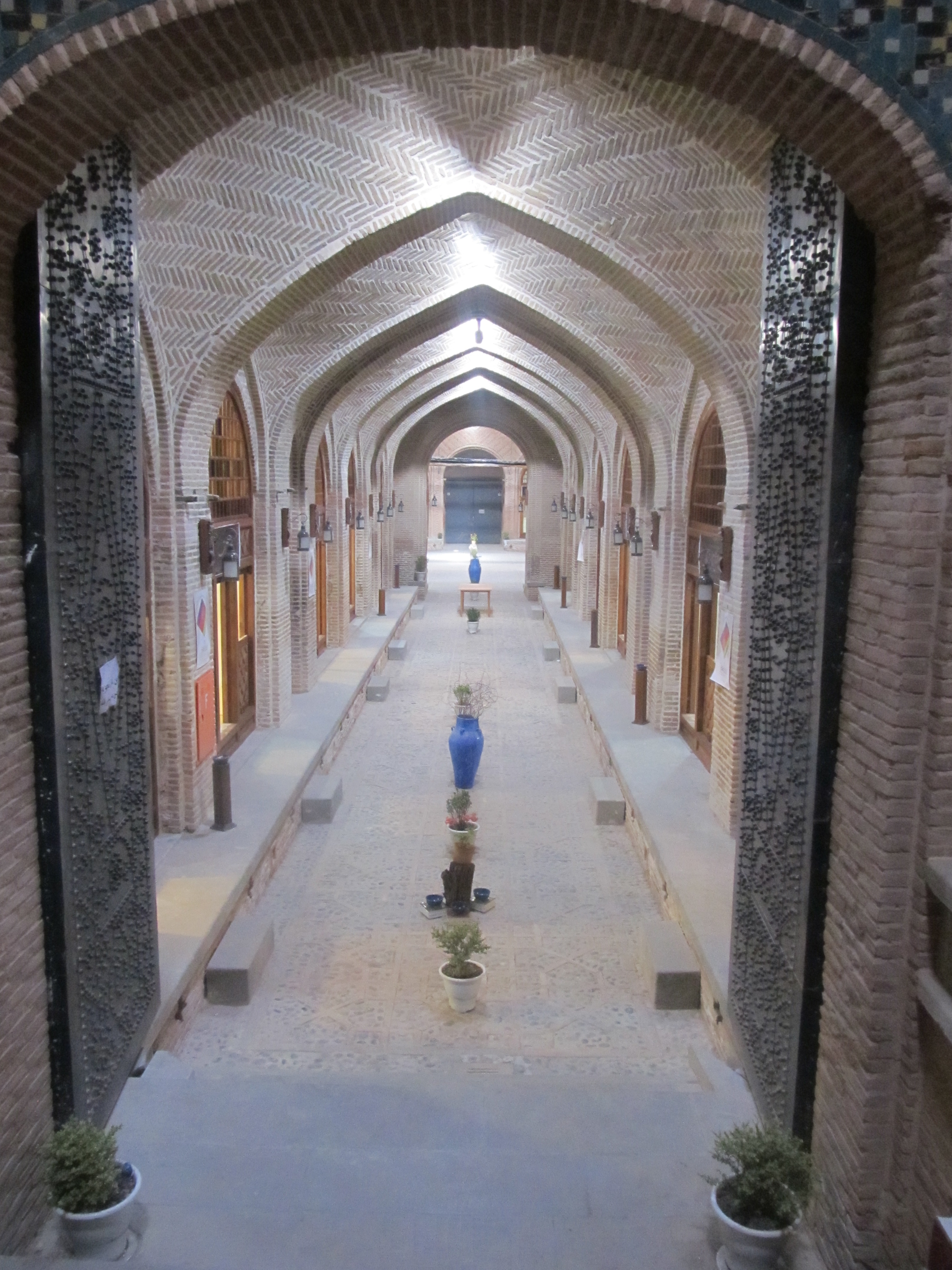

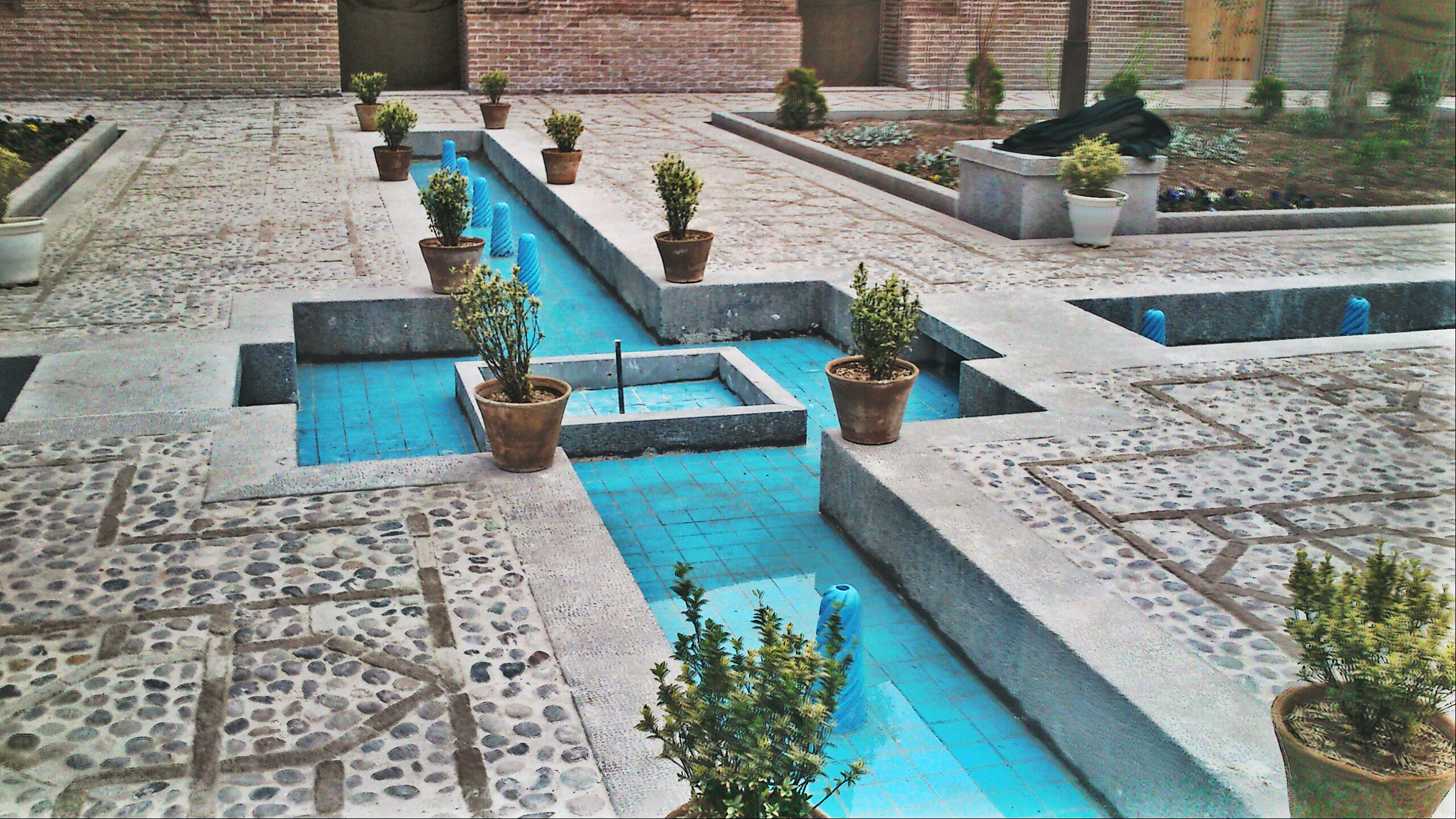

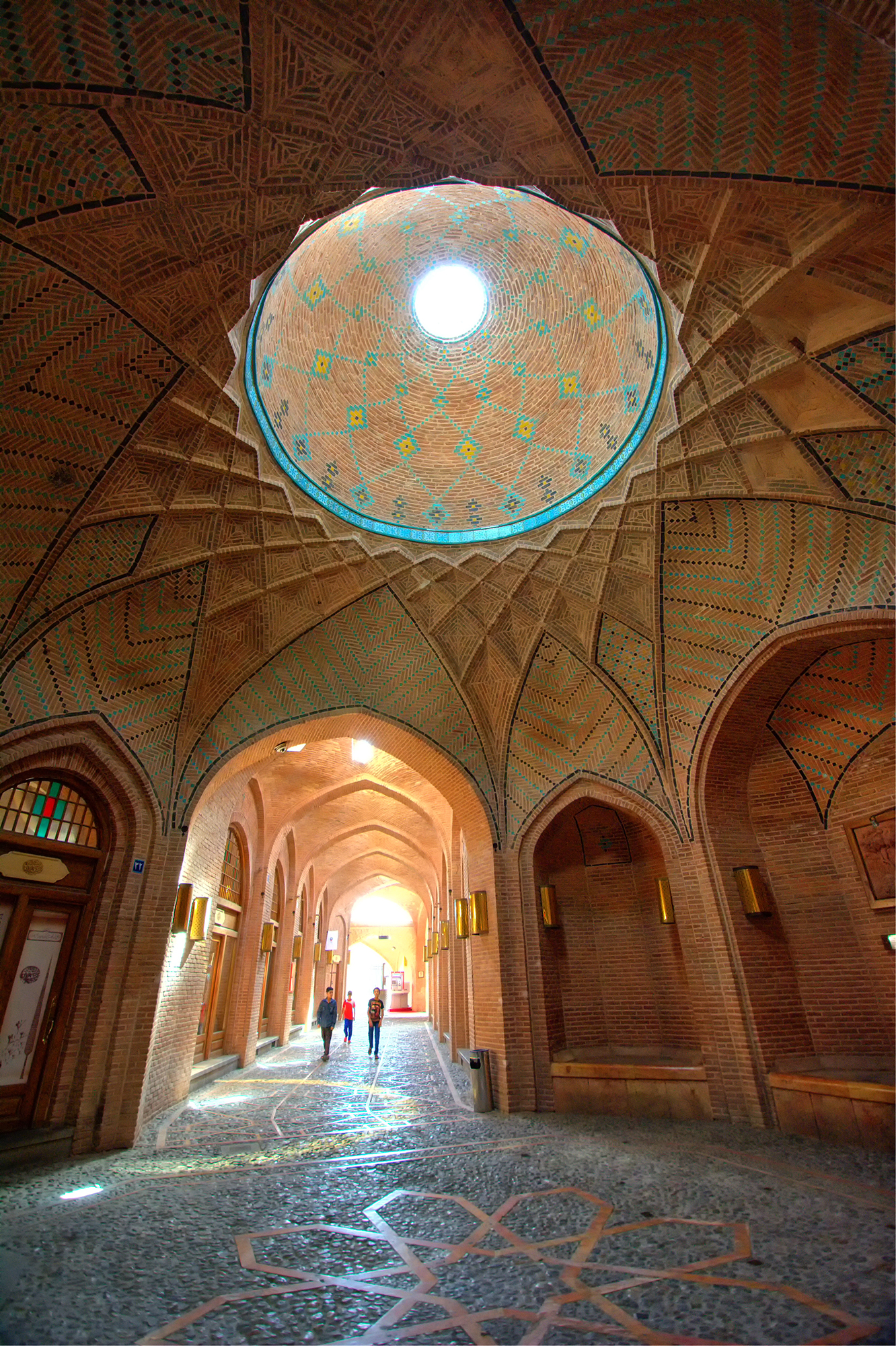

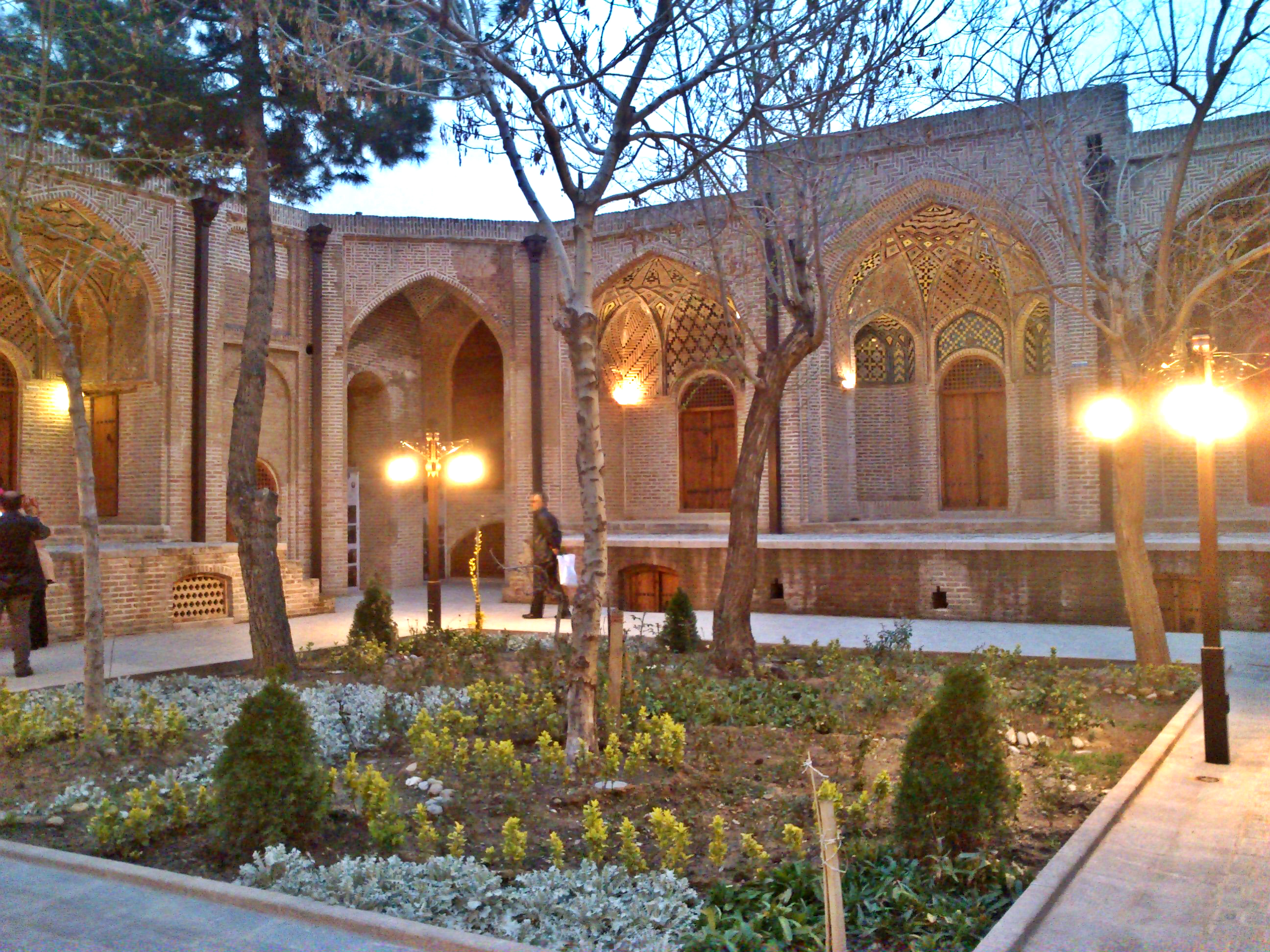

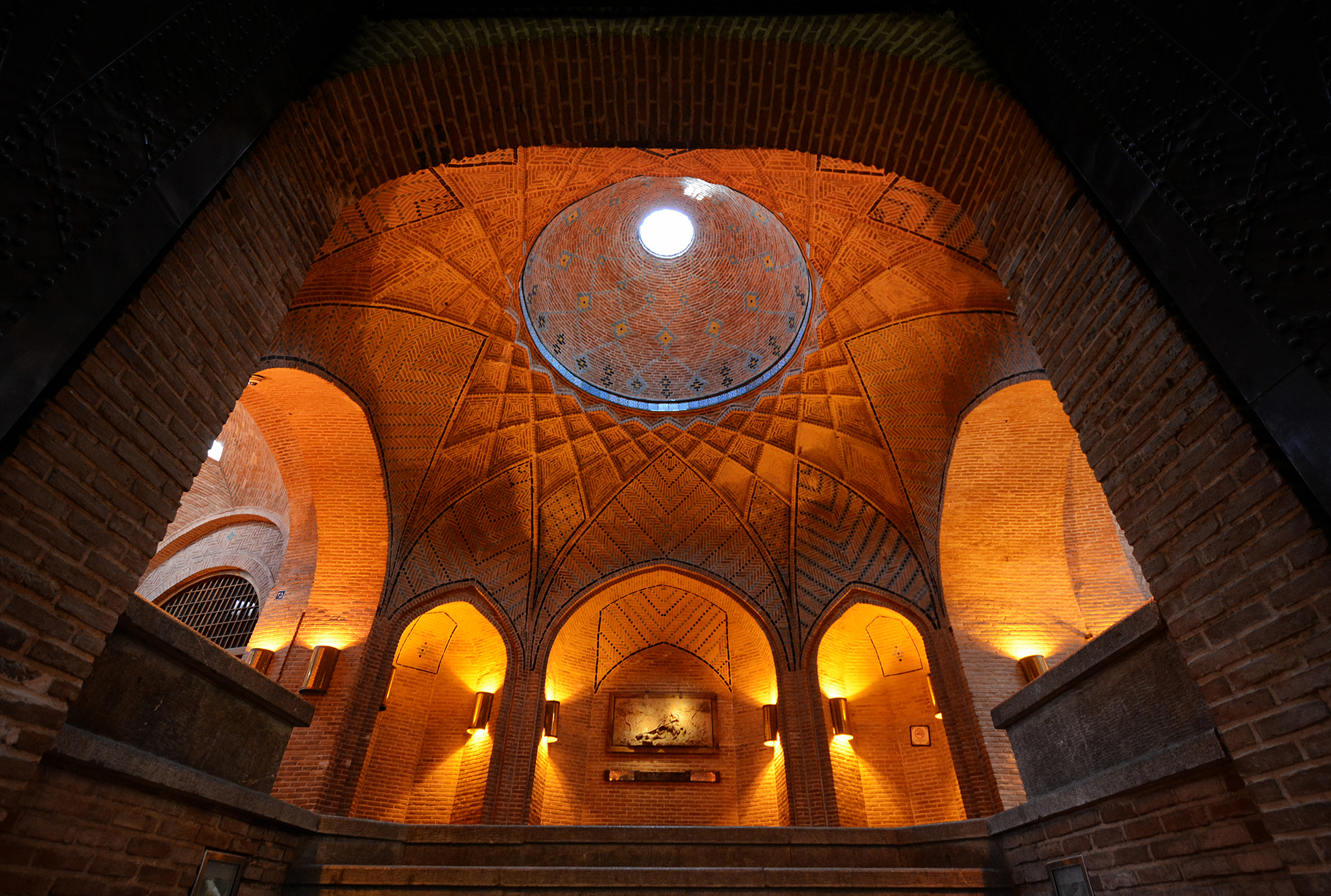

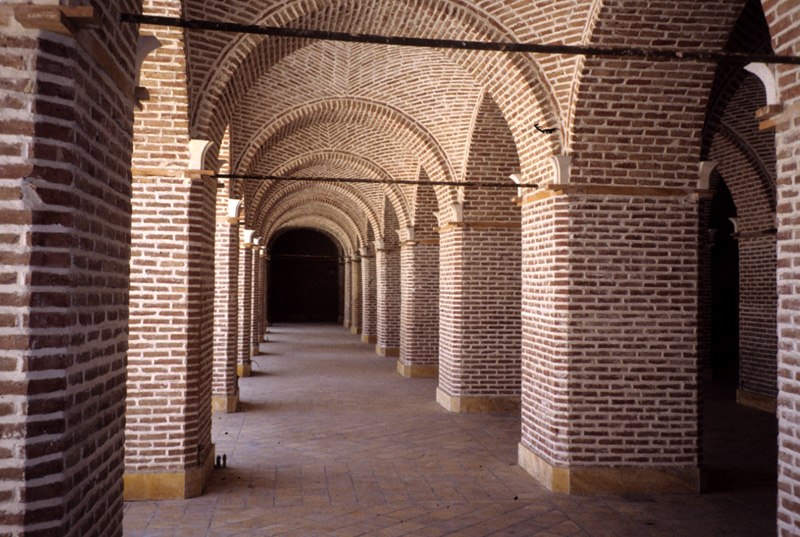

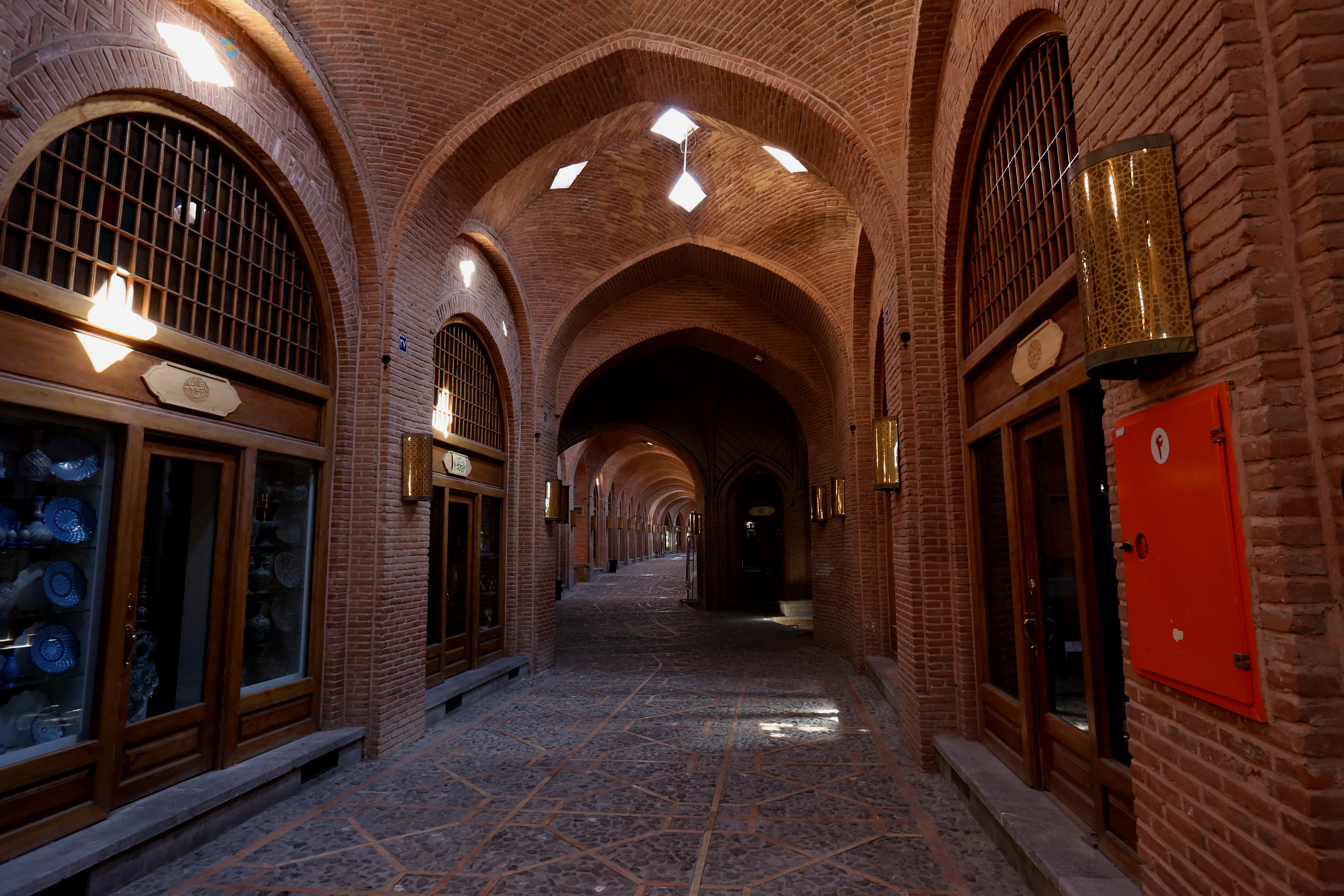

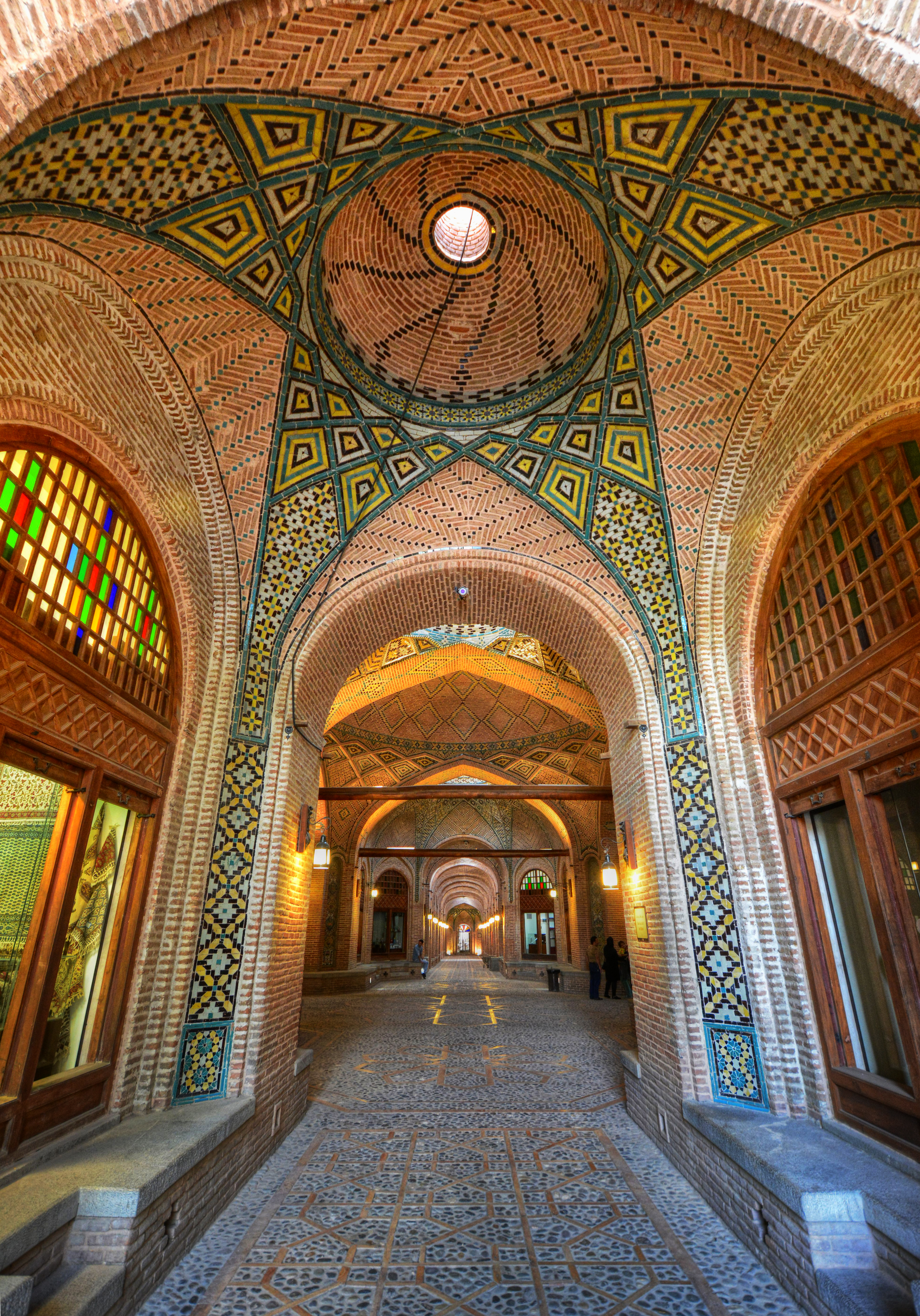

== See also ==
- Architecture of Iran
