= Ali Qapu Gate, Qazvin =

Historic site in Qazvin, Iran

Ali Qapu Gate سردر عالی قاپو
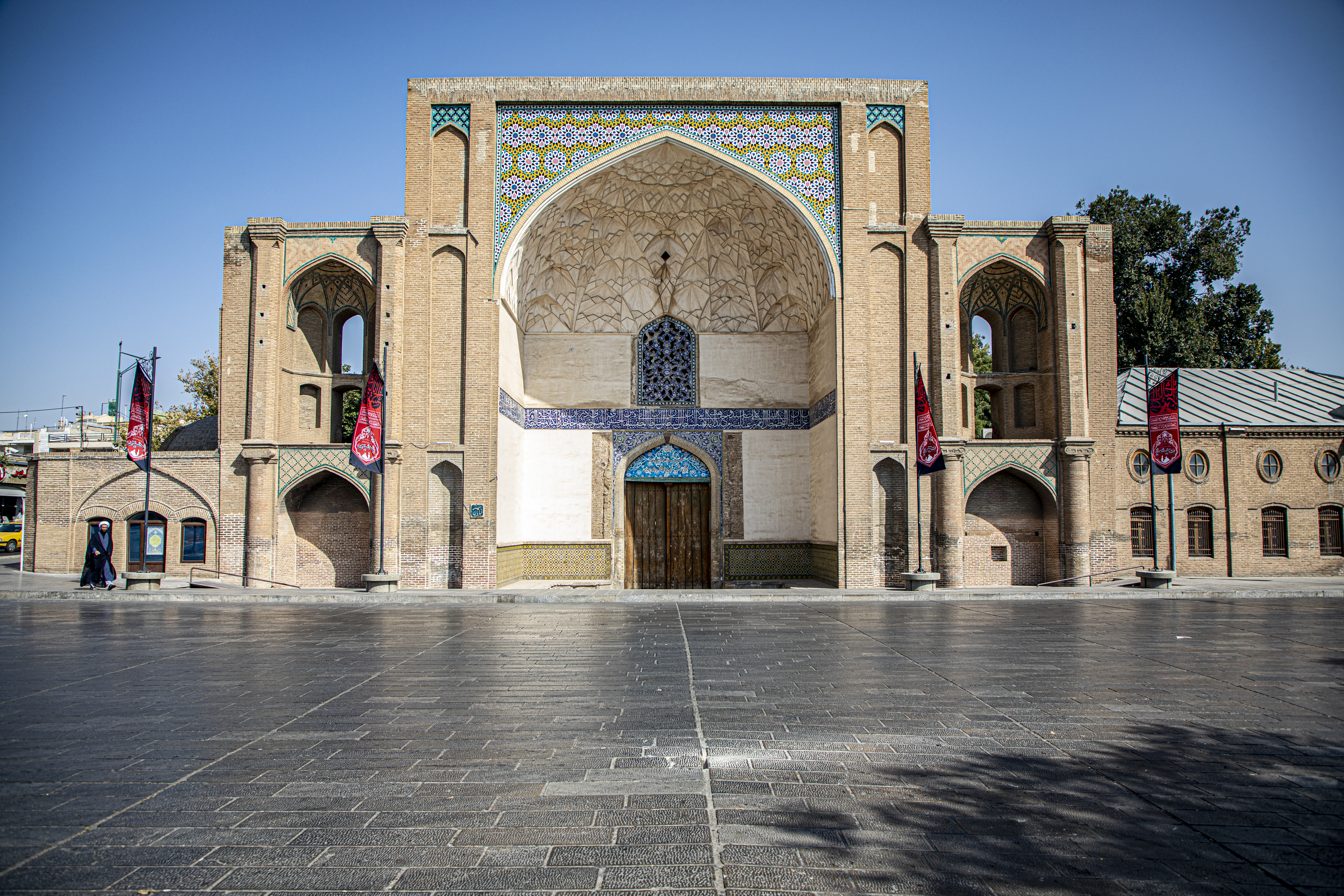

- Location within Iran
- 36.2658°N 50.0031°E
- Location: Qazvin, Iran

Iran National Heritage List
- Official name: Ali Qapu Gate
- Type: Gate
- Designated: 1934
- Reference no.: 213
- Conservation organization: Cultural Heritage, Handicrafts and Tourism Organization of Iran

The Ali Qapu Gate (Persian: سردر عالی قاپو) is a historic gate in Qazvin, Iran. Located at the beginning of the Sepah street, it is one of the 7 gates leading to the Safavid royal complex, and the only surviving one.

== History ==
The gate was built by the order of Shah Tahmasb, as part of the larger royal complex that he commissioned after he moved the capital from Tabriz to Qazvin. It exists in its current form since the rule of Shah Abbas. There is calligraphy by Alireza Abbasi in thuluth script decorating the gate.

It was the southern and the most important gate to the Safavid royal complex, leading to a group of palaces and pavilions, of which only Chehelsotun remains now.

Jean Chardin describes the building as having an inscription reading "گشاده باد به دولت همیشه این درگاه به حق اشهد ان لا اله الا الله"

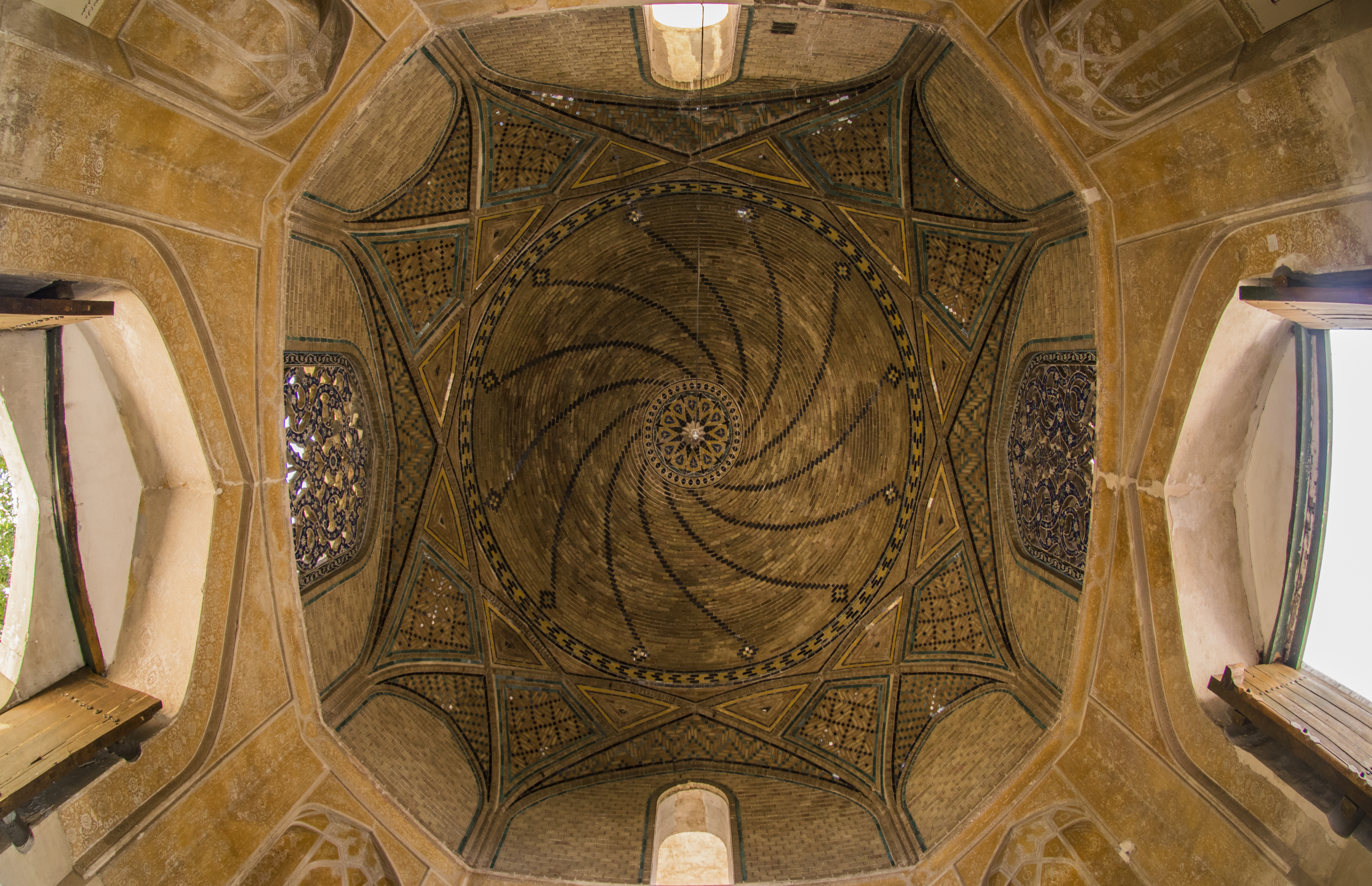
Interior view of the dome.

== Gallery ==
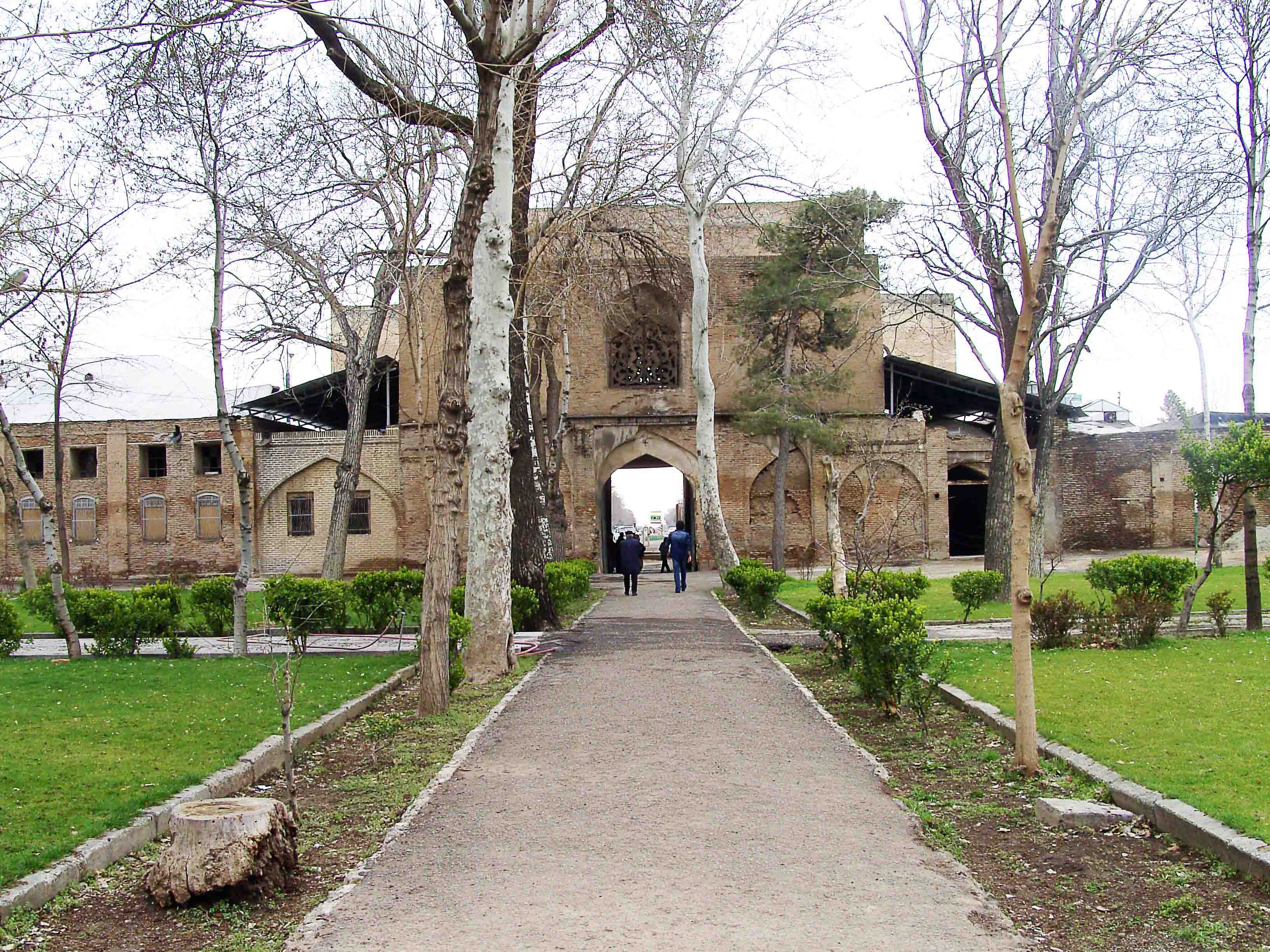

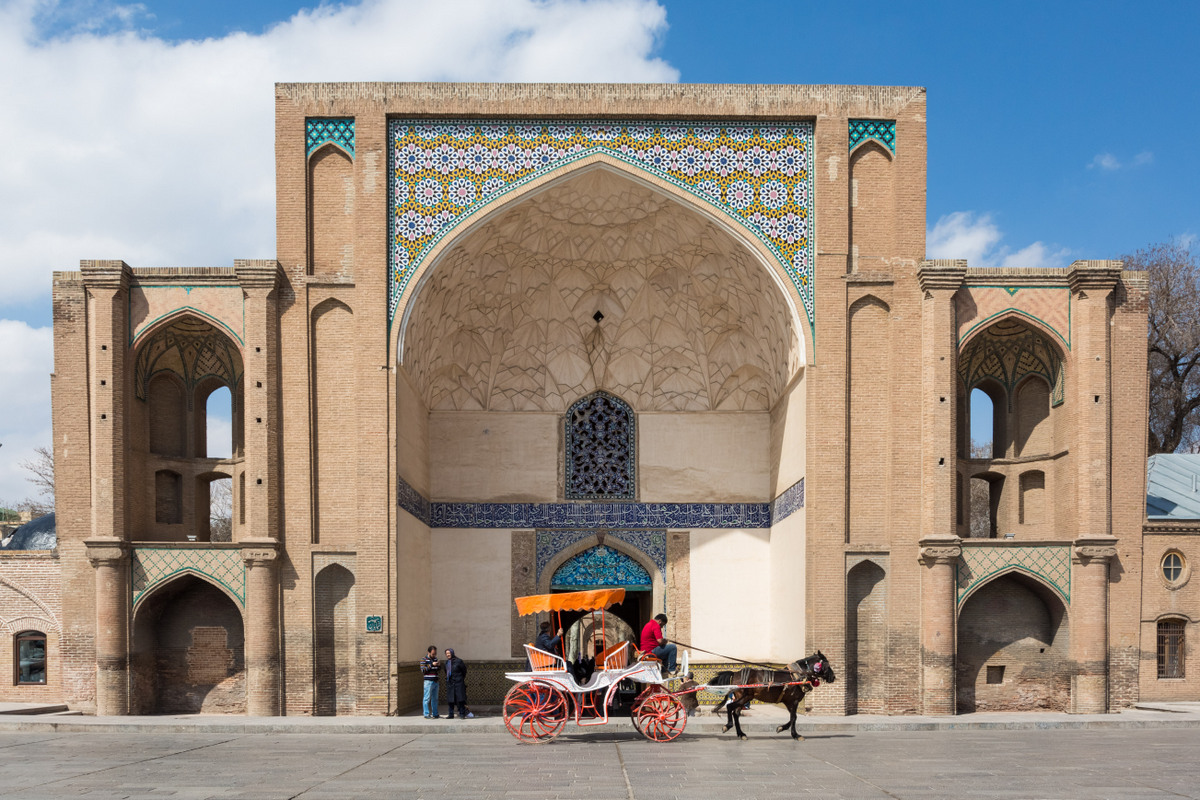

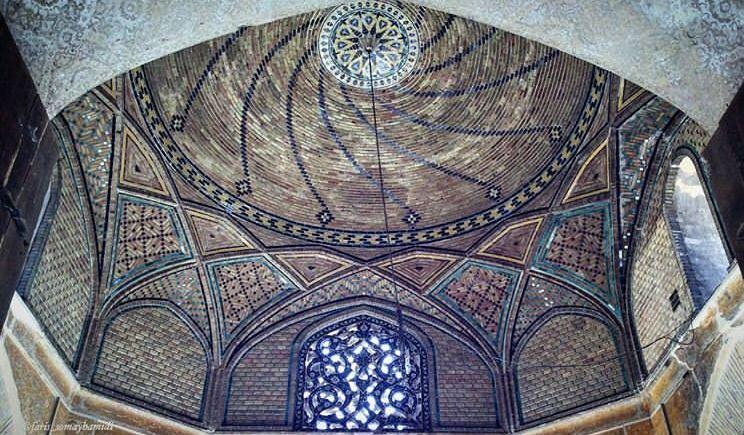
