= Abdol-samad Mirza Ezz ed-Dowleh =

Iranian prince (1843–1929)

Abdol-samad Mirza
- Ezz ed-Dowleh
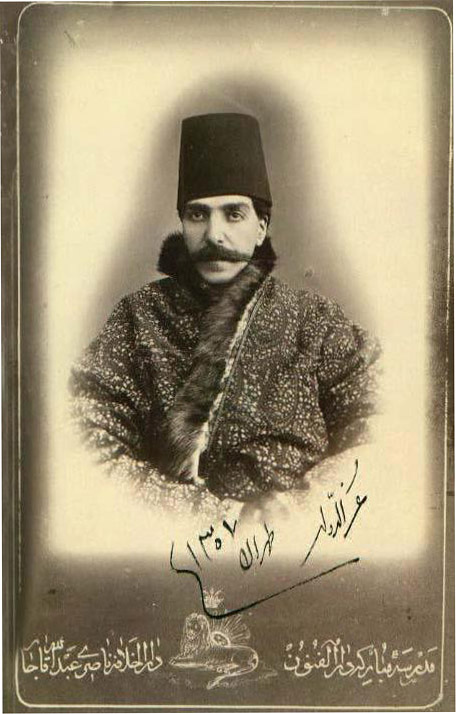
- Ezz ed-Dowleh in 1883

Il khan (chief) of Qajar tribe
- Tenure: 1872 – 1873
- Successor: Ali Reza Khan Azod-ol-Molk

Governor of Qazvin and Borujerd
- Tenure: 1873 – 1874

Governor of Hamadan, Malayer, Tuyserkan and Nahavand
- Tenure: 1874 – 1876

Governor of Zanjan
- Tenure: 1901 – 1902
- Born: Abdol-samad Mirza; March/April 1844; Tehran, Sublime State of Iran
- Died: 21 October 1929 (aged 86); Tehran, Imperial State of Iran
- Burial: Fatima Masumeh Shrine, Qom
- Spouse: Taj Mah Khanum; Negar Khanum
- Father: Mohammad Shah Qajar
- Mother: Oghol Beyga Khanum
- Religion: Shia Islam

Abdol-samad Mirza Ezz ed-Dowleh (Persian: عبدالصمد میرزا عزالدوله; March/April 1844 – 21 October 1929) was a Qajar prince and statesman who served in a number of provincial and central government offices during the reigns of Naser al-Din Shah Qajar and Mozaffar ad-Din Shah Qajar. A half-brother of Naser al-Din Shah, he spent much of his career away from the capital as governor of several provinces, including Qazvin, Hamadan, Zanjan, and the districts of Malayer, Tuyserkan, and Nahavand. His repeated appointment to provincial government made him one of the more prominent members of the Qajar royal family involved in the administration of the provinces.

Contemporary observers, including the American diplomat Samuel Greene Wheeler Benjamin, described his administration in harsh terms and accused him of tyrannical conduct, while his descendants later disputed these allegations. In the final years of Mohammad Ali Shah's reign, Ezz ed-Dowleh sought refuge in the Russian embassy in Tehran. His reasons for doing so were disputed: one account attributed the move to an attempt to avoid taxation, while a family account connected it to fears of retaliation arising from a land dispute in Qazvin. He died in Tehran in 1929.

== Early life ==
Abdol-samad Mirza (middle) and his entourage by Sani al-Mulk, dated 1860

Abdol-samad Mirza was born between March and April on 1844 to Mohammad Shah Qajar and Oghol Beyga Khanum, the Salur Turkmen woman, taken prisoner by Abbas Mirza in 1832 after capturing Sarakhs. He was named Abdol-samad by Mohammad Shah's Grand vizier, Haji Mirza Aqasi, after the latter's mentor Hajj Molla Abdol-samad Hamadani. He was four years old when Naser al-Din Shah ascended the throne. Although he was not considered a potential threat to the throne, he was sent away as governor of provinces that were not believed to be too important or which could not generate large revenues for their governors.

== Career ==
In 1872, Ezz ed-Dowleh became the chief (Il khan) of Qajar tribe and held this position for year, after Ali Reza Khan Azod-ol-Molk replaced him in 1873. It was partly in this capacity that he was selected to join Naser al-Din Shah's entourage on his first journey of Europe in 1873. Ezz ed-Dowleh was a educated man with a knowledge of French and English and also an avid reader and book collector.

== Later life ==
In 1883, Ezz ed-Dowleh was summoned from Hamadan to attend the coronation of Alexander III of Russia in Moscow, who become Emperor of Russia in 1881 following the assassination of Alexander II.

Ezz ed-Dowleh died in Tehran on 21 October 1929 and buried in Fatima Masumeh Shrine in Qom.

== Sources ==
- Eslami, Kambiz (1999). "ʿEzz-al-Dawla, ʿAbd-al-Ṣamad Mīrzā". In Yarshater, Ehsan (ed.). Encyclopædia Iranica (Online ed.). Encyclopædia Iranica Foundation.
- Bamdad, Mehdi (1968). شرح حال رجال ایران در قرن ۱۲ و۱۳ و ۱۴ هجری [Biographies of the Dignitaries of Iran in the 12th, 13th, and 14th Centuries AH] (PDF) (in Persian). Vol. 2. Tehran: Zavvar.
- Benjamin, Samuel Greene Wheeler (1887). Persia and the Persians. London: J. Murray.
- Ardakani, Hosayn Mahbubi (1988). "ʿAżod-al-Molk, ʿAlī Reżā Khan". In Yarshater, Ehsan (ed.). Encyclopædia Iranica (Online ed.). Encyclopædia Iranica Foundation.
