= Göhl =

- Municipality
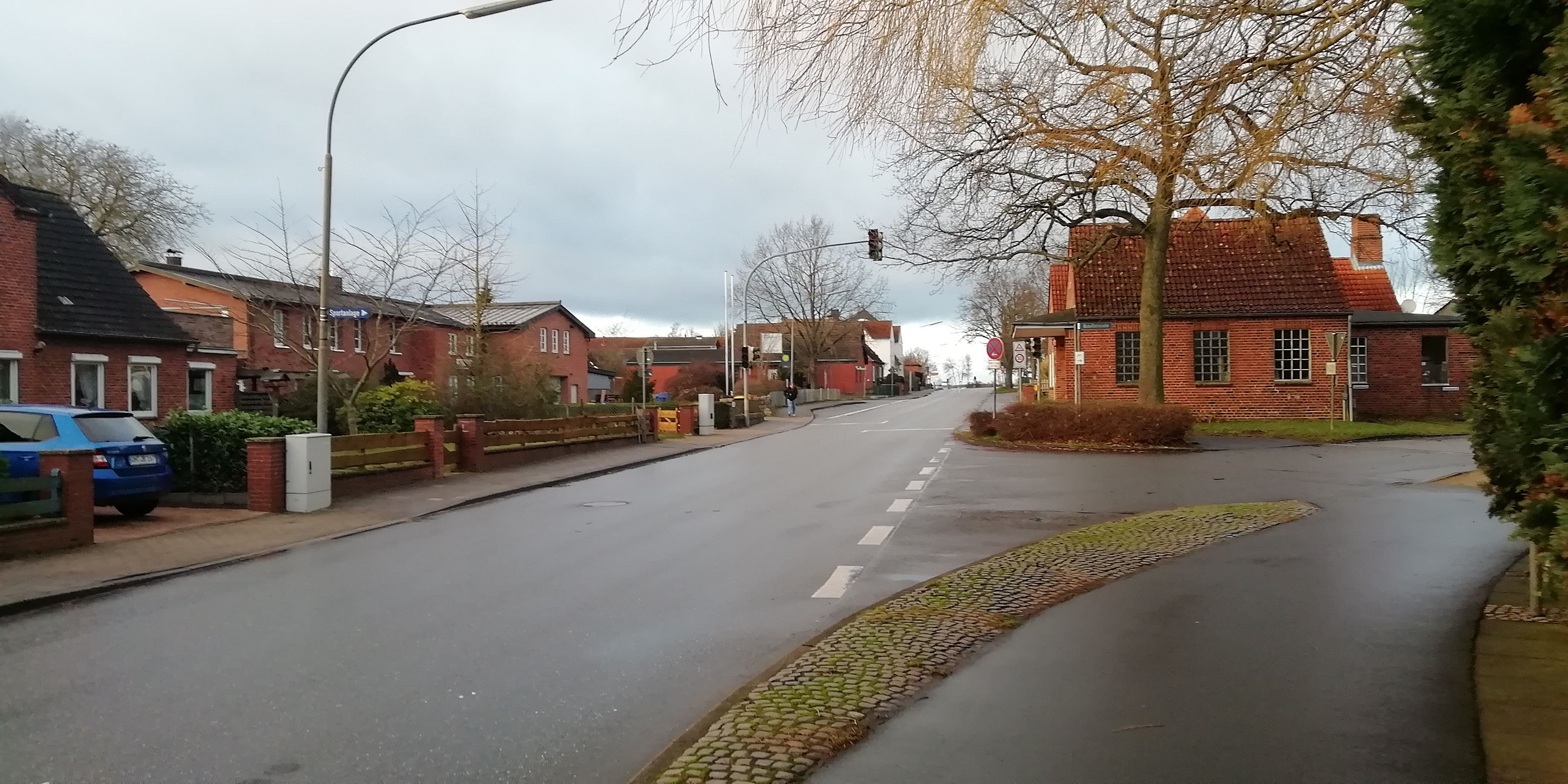

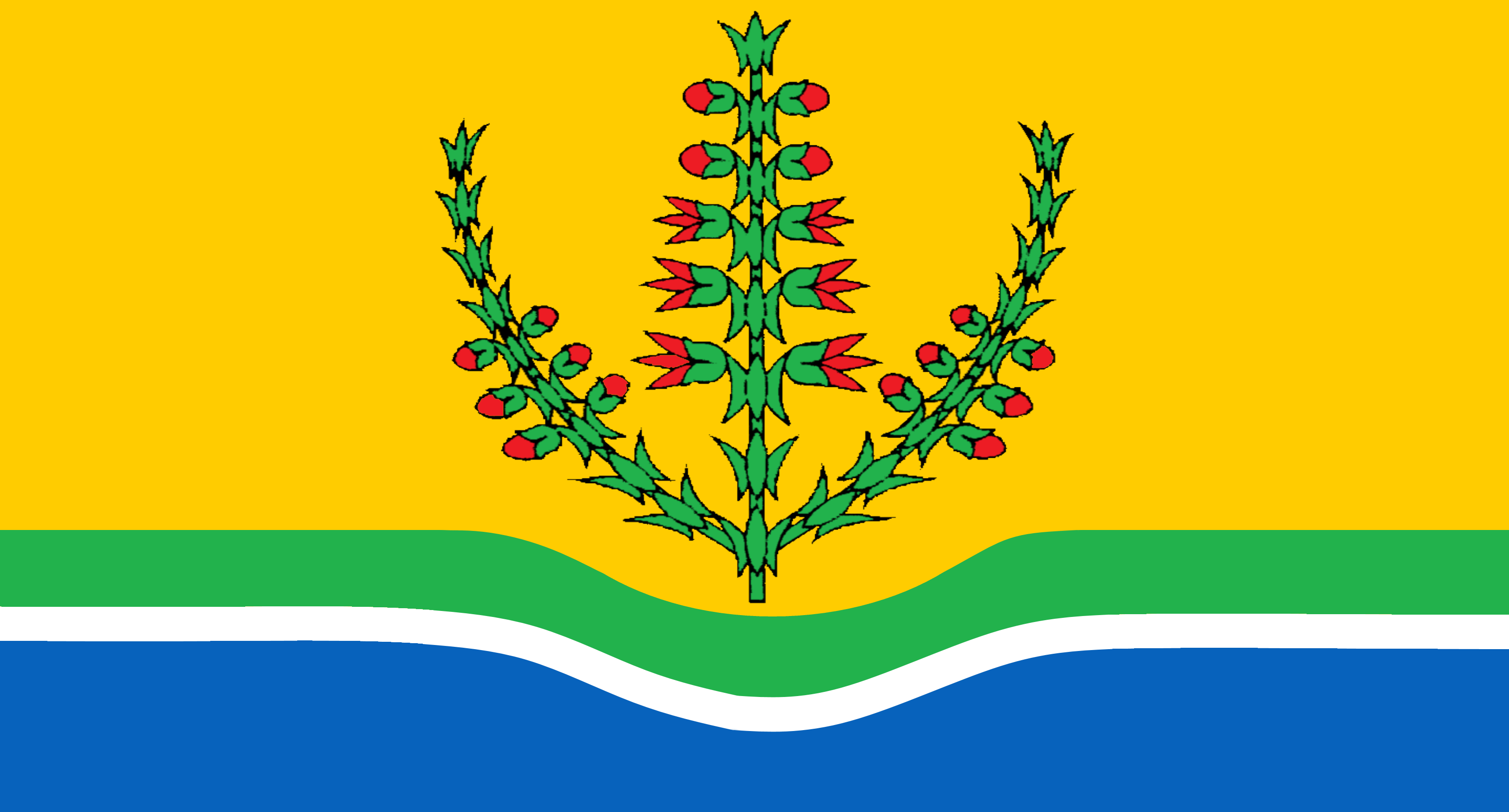
- Flag Coat of arms

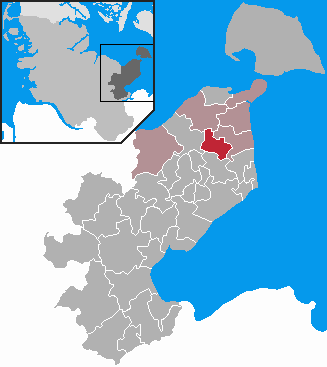
- Location of Göhl within Ostholstein district
- Interactive map of Göhl
- Location within Germany Location within Schleswig-Holstein
- Coordinates: 54°17′N 10°57′E
- Country: Germany
- State: Schleswig-Holstein
- District: Ostholstein
- Municipal assoc.: Oldenburg-Land

Government
  - Mayor: Thomas Bauer (BGG)

Area
  - Total: 21.24 km^{2} (8.20 sq mi)
- Elevation: 19 m (62 ft)

Population (2025-12-31)
  - Total: 1,090
  - Density: 51.3/km^{2} (133/sq mi)
- Time zone: UTC+01:00 (CET)
  - Summer (DST): UTC+02:00 (CEST)
- Postal codes: 23758
- Dialling codes: 04361
- Vehicle registration: OH
- Website: www.amt-oldenburg- land.de

Göhl (German pronunciation: [ˈɡøːl]) is a municipality in the district of Ostholstein, in Schleswig-Holstein, Germany. It lies directly east of the town Oldenburg in Holstein and is a member of the Amt Oldenburg-Land.

== Geography ==
Göhl lies around 3 kilometres (1.9 mi) east of Oldenburg in Holstein on the Wagrian peninsular. The municipality is part of the collective municipality of Oldenburg-Land and the district of Ostholstein.

The southern border of Göhl runs along the Oldenburger Graben through the marshy lands of the former Gruber sea. Göhl borders the municipalities of Heringsdorf to the northeast, Gremersdorf to the northwest, Oldenburg in Holstein to the west, and across the Oldenburger Graben, Riepsdorf to the south.

Göhl is connected to Oldenburg in Holstein, the nearest town, via the road Göhler Chaussee, which allows connectivity of the municipality to the Bundesautobahn 1. The Lübeck–Puttgarden railway runs through the municipality but does not stop for passenger transport. However, a small decommissioned train station still exists in Göhl.

The municipality consists of the settlements Antoinettenhof, Christianstal, Gaarz, Gaarzerfelde, Gaarzermühle, Göhl, Giebelberg, Kremsdorf, Lütjendorf, Neuschwelbek, Plügge, Quals, and Schwelbek.

== History ==
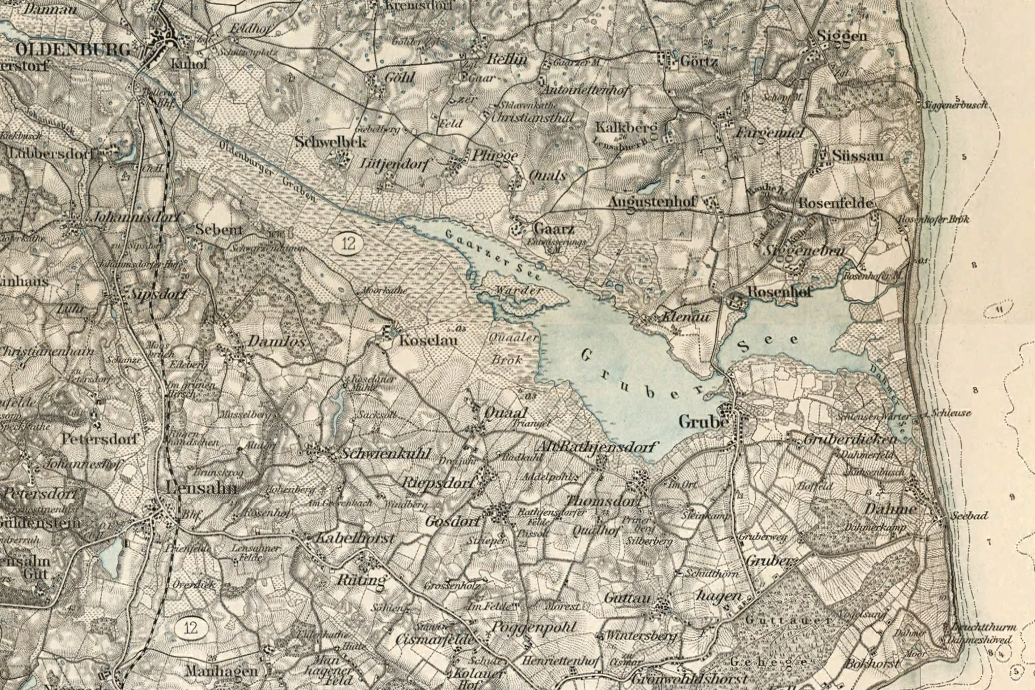
Map of the Gruber sea in 1893, Göhl and its settlements are also shown in the north

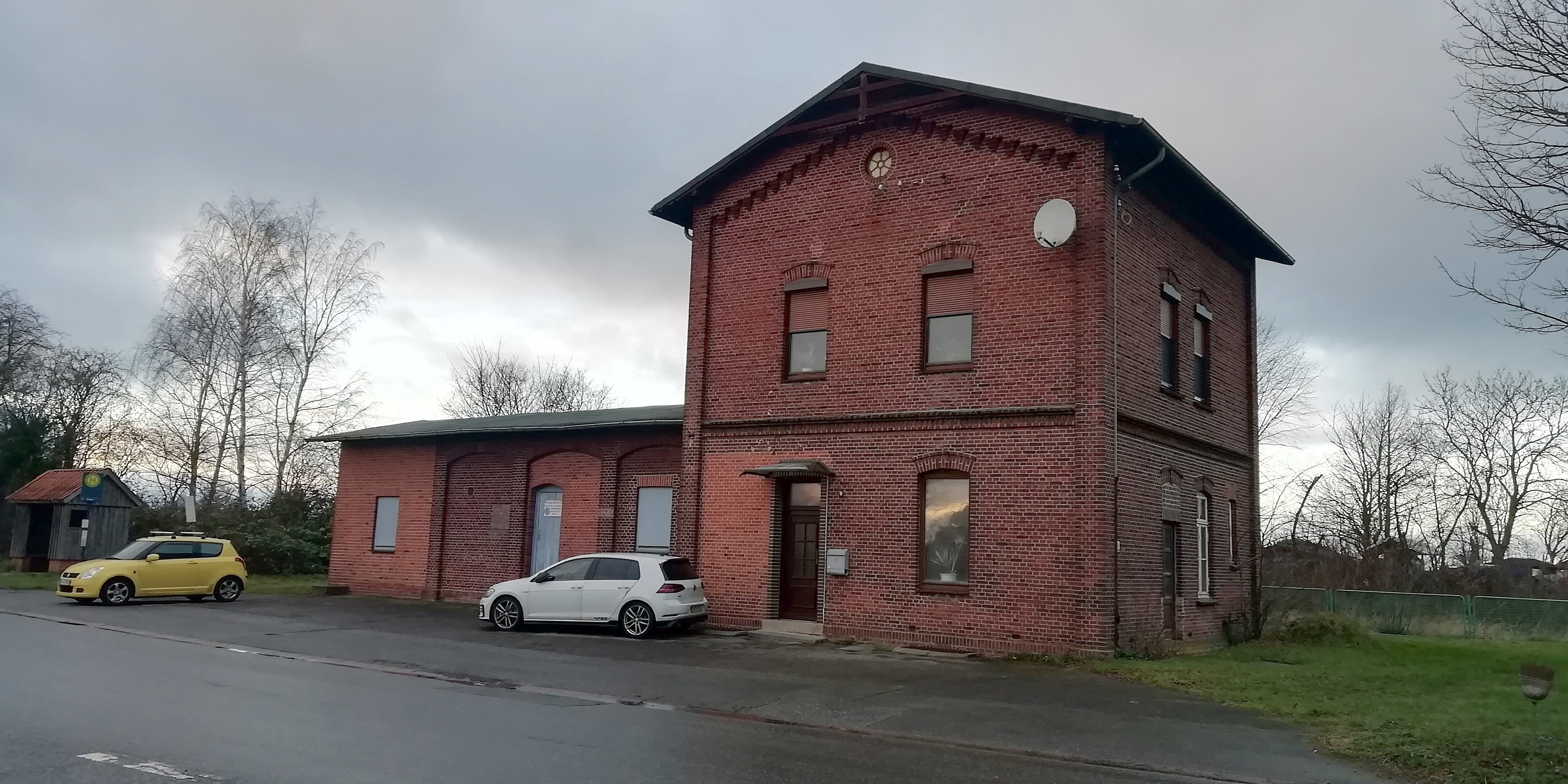
Old train station

The Oldenburger Graben, which now forms the southern border of Göhl, used to be part of a fjord before and during the times of Slavic settlement in the area, its connection to the Baltic Sea would later be severed through natural processes however, leaving behind several marshy inland seas, the biggest of which being the Gruber sea directly south of what is today the municipality of Göhl. Due to the marshy waters of the inland seas no longer being traversable and lacking any sea access, local farmers considered the draining of the seas to avoid future flood damage and expand their farmland in the early 20th century. The first pumps to drain the seas were commissioned in 1926, and state support was attained through first Weimar, and later Nazi agricultural policy.

Göhl was first mentioned under the name Gola, a Slavic word meaning heather, in 1317.

The areas which today make up Göhl have been part of the Gut Schwelbek zu Putlos since the start of the 15th century. During this time, Göhl was known by multiple names, including Ghoele and Ghole. On 15 November 1910, at the time Gutsbezirk Schwelbek, which encompassed the village of Göhl, was transformed into the municipality of Goel. This new municipality grew with the addition of first the Gutsbezirk Kremsdorf in 1928, and then the municipality of Plügge in 1939. The spelling of Goel was standardized to the modern version of Göhl in 1937.

The Kreis Oldenburger Eisenbahn-Gesellschaft (KOE) rail company commissioned the Oldenburg - Heiligenhafen railway line, which ran trains through the Göhl station, in 1898. During 1976 however, all passenger transport was ceased, which left the train station decommissioned to this day.

A commercial area of 2.5 ha was created in the north of the settlement of Göhl in 1995.

The current coat of arms and flag were adopted in June 2010.

== Demographics ==
As of December 31, 2021, Göhl has a population of 1,118 with 560 (50.1%) being male, and 558 (49.9%) being female. The median age was 45.4 as of 2021.

Göhl had the highest percentage of under 18 years olds in Ostholstein at 24% (293) as of 2003. This population has since shrunken to 17.3% (193) in 2021 however.

Historical population

Year	Pop.	±%
1867	891	—
1871	840	−5.7%
1875	832	−1.0%
1880	858	+3.1%
1885	751	−12.5%
1910	180	−76.0%
1925	259	+43.9%
1933	324	+25.1%
1939	774	+138.9%
1946	1,768	+128.4%
1950	1,650	−6.7%
1961	1,062	−35.6%
1970	951	−10.5%

Year	Pop.	±%
1987	852	−10.4%
1990	865	+1.5%
2000	1,095	+26.6%
2001	1,174	+7.2%
2002	1,204	+2.6%
2003	1,203	−0.1%
2004	1,192	−0.9%
2005	1,208	+1.3%
2006	1,217	+0.7%
2007	1,188	−2.4%
2008	1,194	+0.5%
2009	1,198	+0.3%
2010	1,181	−1.4%

Year	Pop.	±%
2011	1,160	−1.8%
2012	1,144	−1.4%
2013	1,147	+0.3%
2014	1,147	+0.0%
2015	1,133	−1.2%
2016	1,116	−1.5%
2017	1,112	−0.4%
2018	1,105	−0.6%
2019	1,118	+1.2%
2020	1,119	+0.1%
2021	1,118	−0.1%
2023	1,139	+1.9%

Early data may be affected by territorial fluctuation.
Sources: 1867-1970, 1910, 1925-1939, 1946, 1950, 1961, 1987, 2000-2021, 2023

=== Citizenship ===
In the 2022 census, 1,071 people (97.6%) in Göhl possessed only German citizenship, 1,046 of which (95.4% of the population) were born in Germany. Residents of other citizenship in the 2022 census were: 11 (1%) Polish, 5 (0.5%) Ukrainian, 4 (0.4%) Syrian, and 6 (0.5%) of other unspecified nationality.

Citizenship	2022		2011	
Citizenship	Number	%	Number	%
German	1,071	97.6	1,156	98.4
Polish	11	1	7	0.6
Ukrainian	5	0.5	/	/
Syrian	4	0.4	/	/
Dutch	/	/	3	0.3
Austrian	/	/	3	0.3
Russian	/	/	3	0.3
Unspecified	6	0.5	3	0.3

=== Religion ===
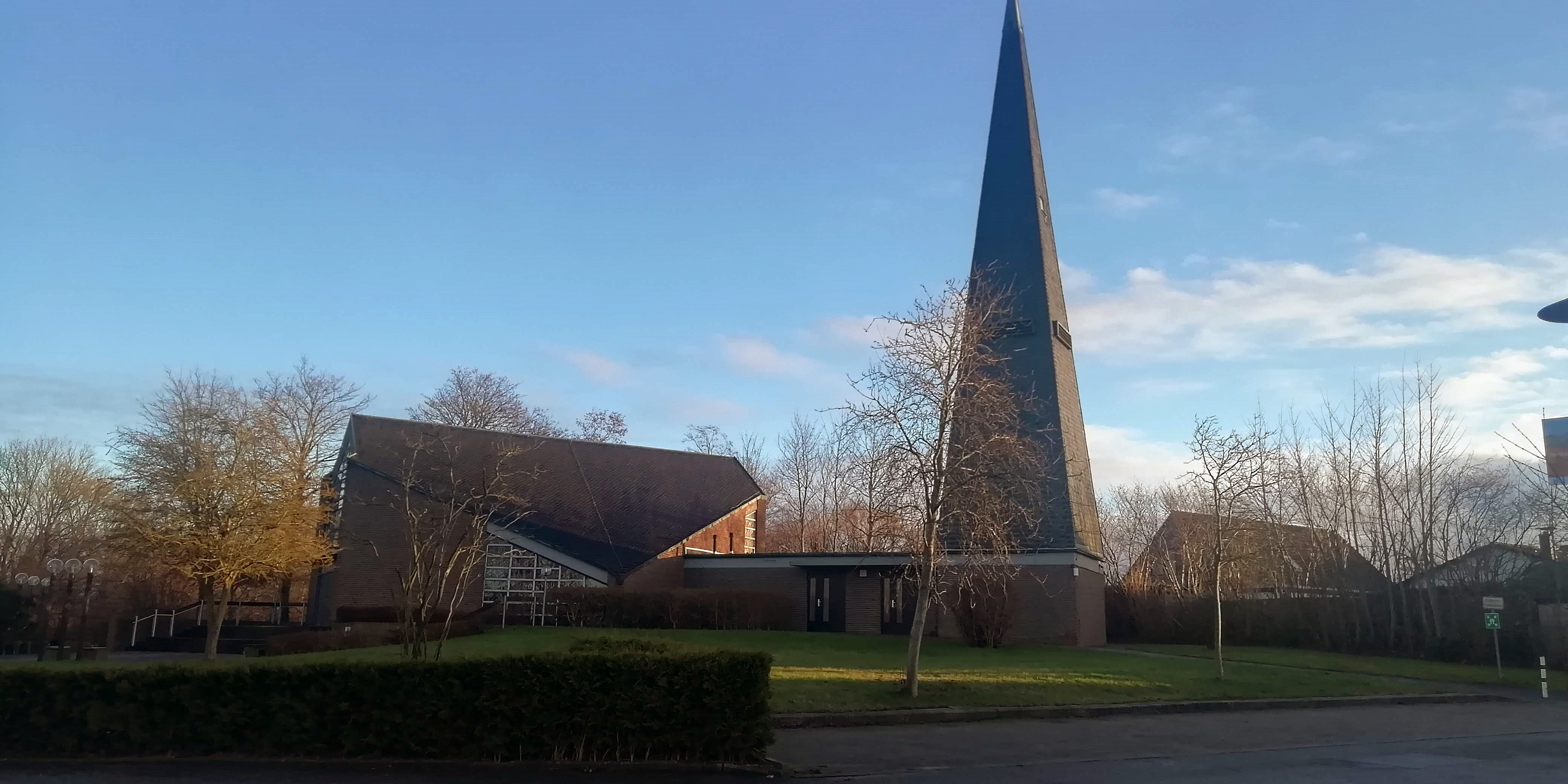
Marco-Kapelle

In the 2022 census, 613 people (55.9%) were members of the Evangelical Church in Germany, with 58 (5.3%) belonging to the Catholic church, and 425 (38.8%) being either irreligious or belonging to another confession.

Confession or Church	2022		2011	
Confession or Church	Number	%	Number	%
Evangelical Church in Germany	613	55.9	789	67.1
Catholic Church in Germany	58	5.3	38	3.2
Other or irreligious	425	38.8	348	29.6

The only church in the municipality is the evangelical-lutheran Marco chapel (Marco-Kapelle) opposite of the kindergarten in the settlement of Göhl.

== Politics ==
The current mayor of Göhl is Thomas Bauer (BGG), who had been the deputy mayor from 1998 to 2006, he has since continuously been reelected as the mayor of Göhl.

=== Elections ===
Total 11 seats
- BGG: 7
- CDU: 4

The most recent election in Göhl were the 2023 Schleswig-Holstein municipal elections, where the BGG was reelected as the strongest faction despite losing one seat. The SPD last participated in the 2013 election.

Candidate	Party	Votes	%	+/-	Seats	+/-
Thomas Bauer	Bürgergemeinschaft Gemeinde Göhl (BGG)	1,791	59.0	▼11	7	▼1
Mechthild Friederichsen	Christian Democratic Union of Germany (CDU)	1,170	38.5	▲8.5	4	▲1
Udo Tornow	Independent	77	2.5	New	0	±0
Valid votes		3,038	99.4	▼0.5		
Invalid votes		18	0.6%	▲0.5		
Electorate/voter turnout		597	62.3	▲6.1		
Source: Statistical Office of Hamburg and Schleswig-Holstein

==== Historical seat distribution ====
Year	BGG	CDU	SPD	Ind.	Source
2023	7	4	-	-	
2018	8	3	-	-	
2013	7	3	1	-	
2008	8	2	1	-	
2003	7	2	2	-	

==== List of mayors ====
- since 2006: Thomas Bauer (BGG)
- 1990-2006: Johann Höper (BGG)

=== Coat of Arms and Flag ===
Coat of arms of Göhl

The coat of arms and flag of Göhl were created by Henning Höppner, who had created multiple insignia in Wagria. It was registered with the state of Schleswig-Holstein in 2010. The heather plant in the center is in reference to the origin of the municipality's name, stemming from the Slavic word "Gola" ("heather"). The bottom sections of the shield represent the green land, and the Oldenburger Graben which forms the southern border of the municipality.

Blazon: "Shield Or a heather plant Vert with three branches and 22 blossoms Gules, in base two bars of Vert and Azure parted by a barrulet Argent, all three countersunk in centre."

The flag of Göhl is a heraldic flag, and shares the same design as the coat of arms.

== Culture and associations ==
The local sports association, SV Göhl, was founded in 1970 and has around 500 members.

The German Red Cross in Göhl acts as not only a medical service focusing on senior care, but also a cultural association; organizing, among other things, flea markets, game nights, and trips.

In the southernmost settlement of Göhl, Gut Gaarz, is a historic estate under family ownership that was built in 1690 and currently acts as a family resort as well as farm.

== Education ==
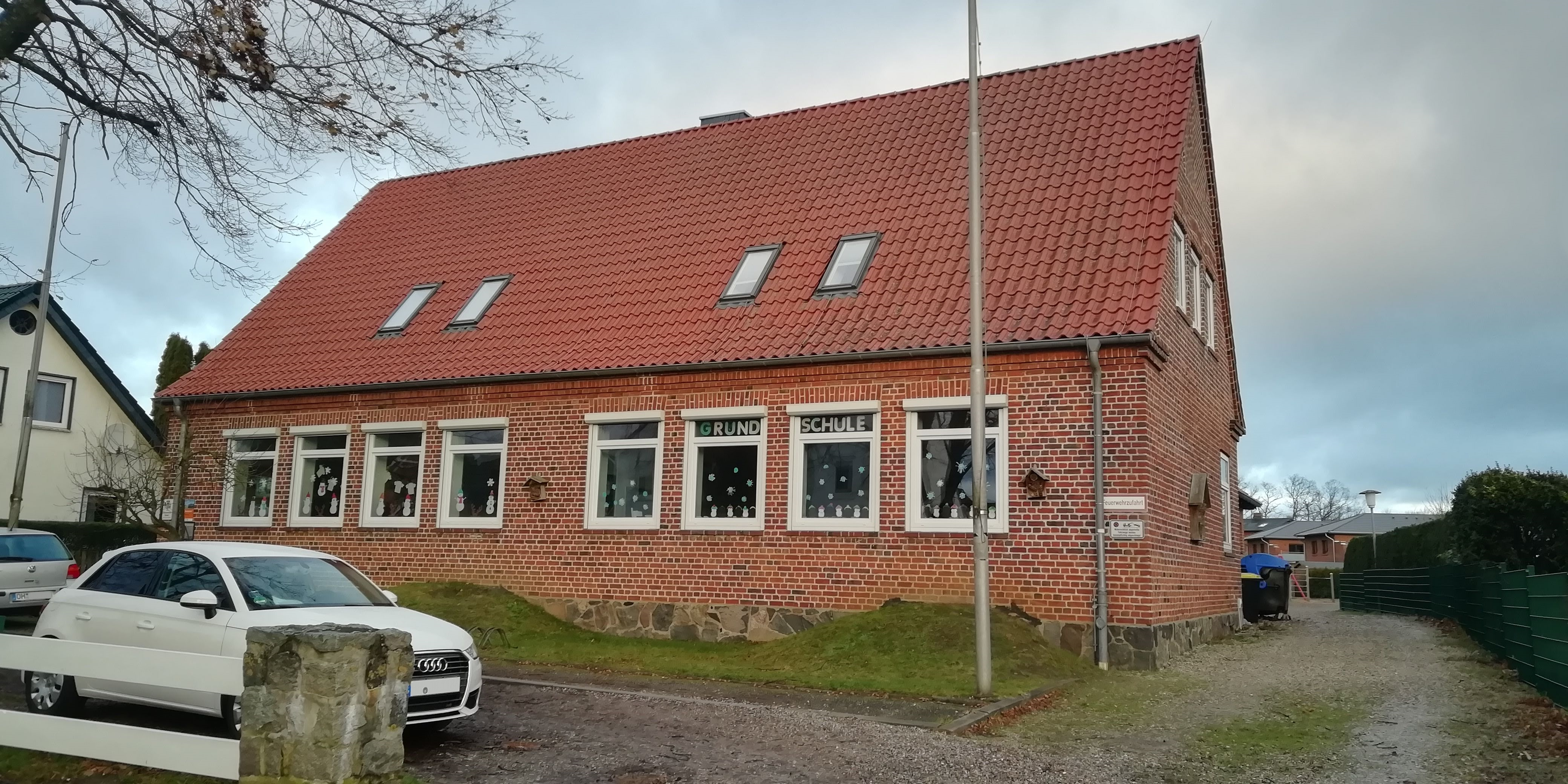
Elementary school Grundschule Göhl

Göhl is home to an elementary school called Grundschule Göhl and a kindergarten.
