= Kembs (Gremersdorf) =

- Ortsteil of Gremersdorf
- Interactive map of Kembs
- Location within Germany Location within Schleswig-Holstein
- Coordinates: 54°20′52″N 10°55′03″E
- Country: Germany
- State: Schleswig-Holstein
- District: Ostholstein
- Municipality: Gremersdorf

Population
  - Total: 50
- Time zone: UTC+01:00 (CET)
  - Summer (DST): UTC+02:00 (CEST)
- Postal codes: 23758

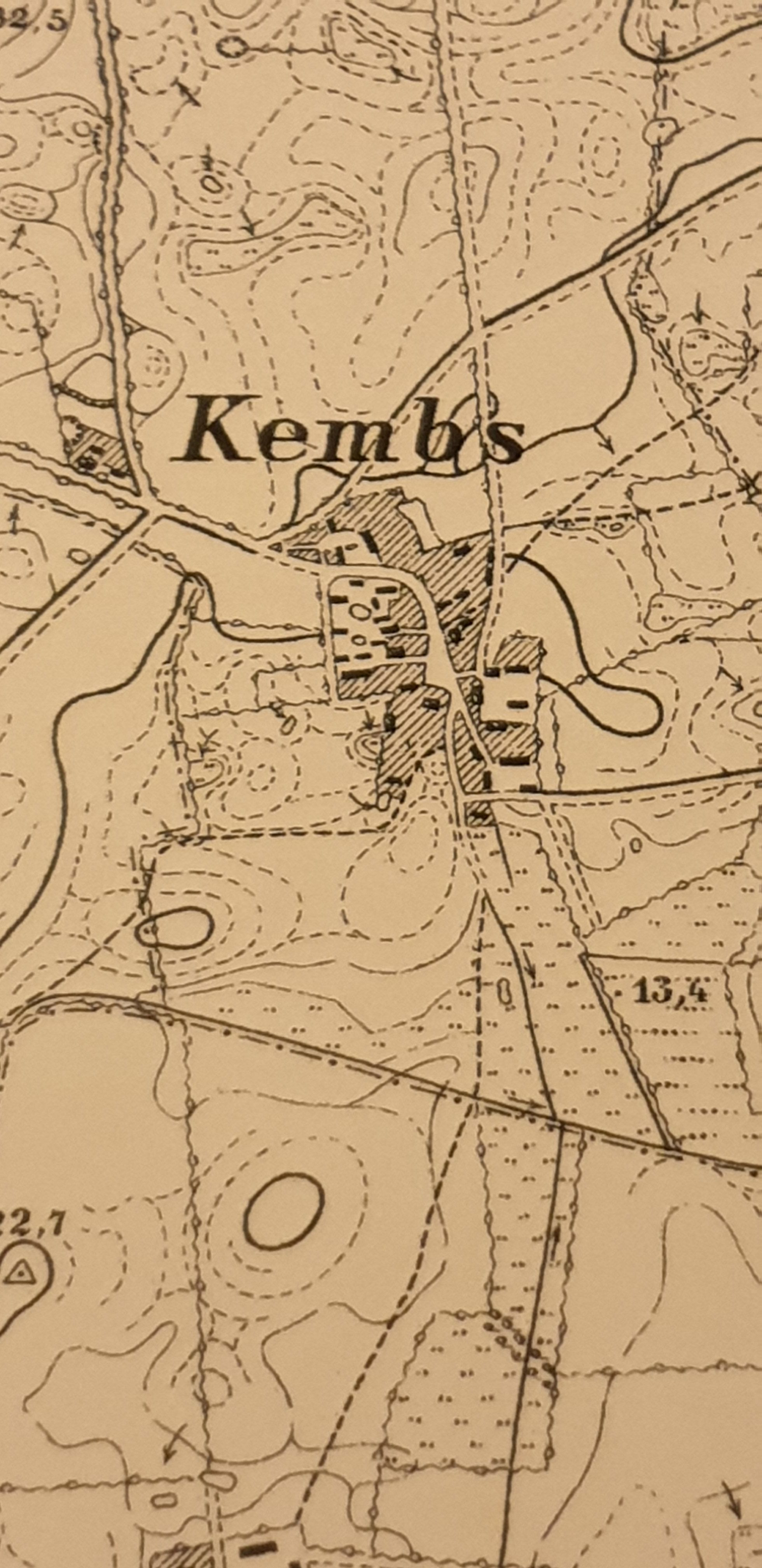
Kembs in 1877

Kembs is a small village (Ortsteil) in the municipality of Gremersdorf in Germany.

== Geografie ==
Kembs is located about seven kilometers southeast of Oldenburg in Holstein at the district road 41 from Oldenburg in Holstein to Heiligenhafen. The Baltic Sea with the Kembs Beach is about 2 km to the north.

== History ==
The name Kembs has its origin in the Old Polabian word Kapica which means hill in the swamp, island, but the area around Kembs was already settled before the Slavs. Finds from the Globular Amphora culture on the Saaltzer Kamp proved a colonization around 3.500 bis 2.800 a. Chr. n... Finds from the urn field at Kembs by R. Klinkhamer prove a settlement in the Bronze Age. The place was occupied by the Warini until the 3rd-century who left their homeland during the Migration Period. Slavs (West Slavs) from the area north east of the Carpathian Mountains between upper Vistula, middle Dnieper and Desna River followed them and the place was named Kapica. As from the 8th century until the 12th century, Kembs, or Kapica as it was called these days, belonged to the settlement area of the Obotrites, more exact to the tribe called Wagri with their administrative seat in Starigard. Six Pit-houses and a grave of a Slavic girl had been found in Kembs. Between the 12th century and the 13th century, the village became owned by a family called Schorlemer who fought side by side with the Counts of Schauenburg and Holstein during the German eastward expansion. The Knight Ludolf Scorlemer appears in the first written reference of the village Kembs on 12 May 1267 during an area swap where Gerhard I, Count of Holstein-Itzehoe exchanged his village Sulsdorf (Zoldestorpe) with 10 yards against the village of villa Kempiz (as Kembs was called these days) which belonged to the St.-Johannis-Monastery, Lübeck. . As of 1267 the village owned by the Counts of Holstein. On the 28. October 1304 the widow of Henry I, Count of Holstein-Rendsburg, the countess Heilwig (1265–1324) with her children's Gerhard III, Count of Holstein-Rendsburg and Giselbert sold the villa Kempetze called village to the St.-Johannis-Monastery in Lübeck. As from this date Kembs belonged under private but also under sovereign law to the St.-Johannis-Monastery which was under Imperial immediacy.

The Ducatus Holsatiae Nova Tabula made by Henricus Hondius II shows Kembs 1630 as Tems.

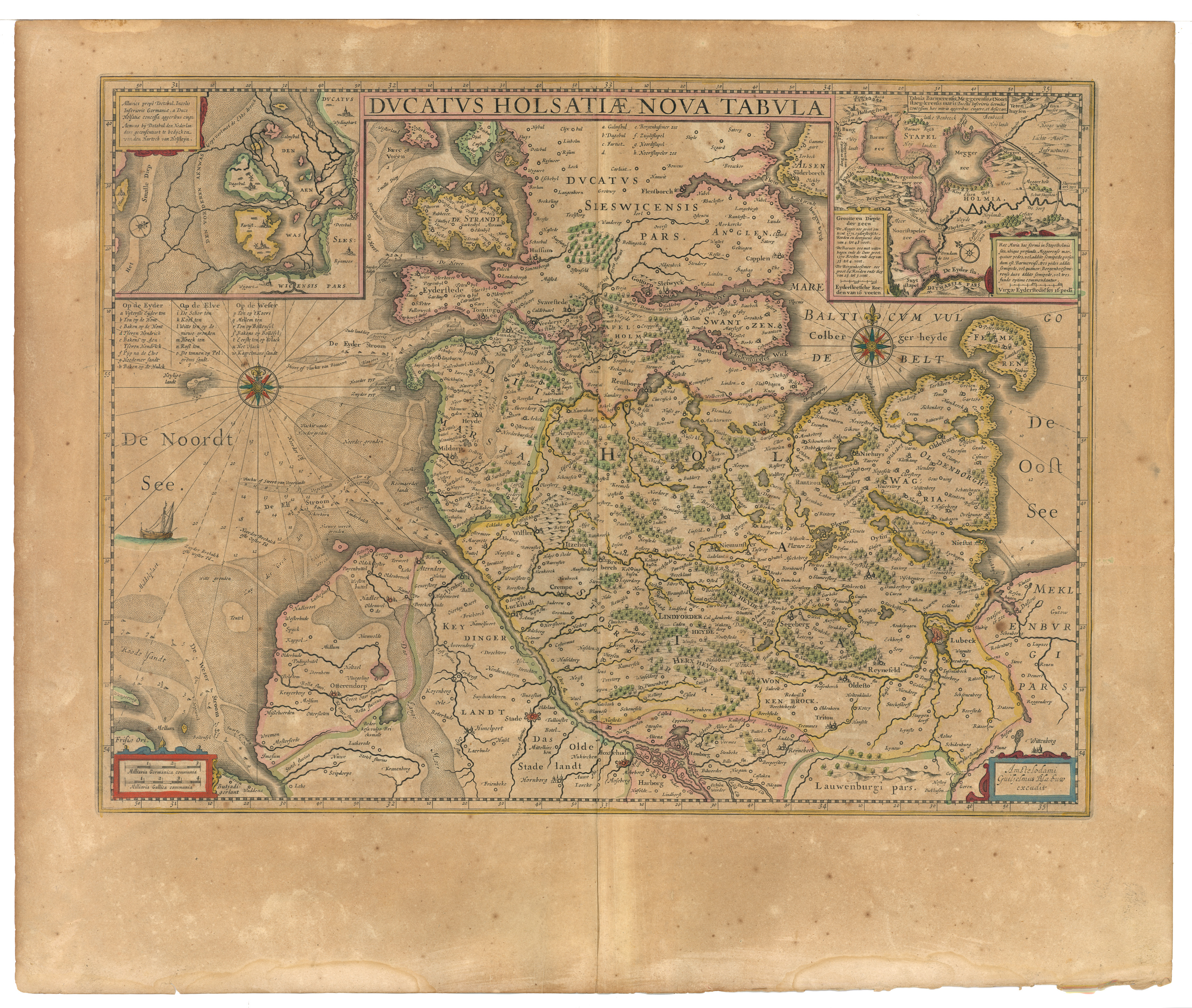
Ducatus Holsatiae Nova Tabula 1645

In 1789, Kembs was drawn as Kems on the Varendorf Map. In the course of a comparison between Denmark-Holstein and Lübeck at the beginning of 1802 and the end of the Reichsdeputationshauptschluss Kembs became part of the prussian Duchy of Holstein. and was especially managed as a so-called Lübsches Stadtstiftsdorf. Taxes and levies were administered by the Cismar office, military affairs by the Oldenburg property district and goodwill and police business by commissioned notaries. Peasant bailiffs (Bauernvögte) took over the internal administration and the external representation of the village. After the Austro-Prussian War in 1866 Kembs became part of the newly founded Prussian Province of Schleswig-Holstein in 1867. Kembs became a Prussian rural community (Landgemeinde) and belonged to district Putlos until 1937. It belonged to the parish Heiligenhafen. Kembs is part of the municipality Gremersdorf since 1. April 1937. The Volunteer fire department Kembs was established in 1934 and is now managed with the neighbour village Dazendorf as Volunteer Fire Department Kembs-Dazendorf.

== Farms ==
The St.Johannis-Jungfrauenkloster was the owner of the village from 28 October 1304 to 1806 and thus overlord, the farmers were vassals they had no real property, they only owned the buildings (house, stables), the moving things and the cattle. They were bound by the grounds they cultivated, but they were no serfs. The vassals could bequeath their property. Widows who had not again married had to leave the farm within a year.

Vassal and levies in 1700
Vassal	Size	Amount
Martin Raloff (Rahlf)	3,5	69 Mark Lübsch 14 Schilling 1/2 Witten
Peter Lieske (Liesche)	3	69 Mark 12 Schilling
Marx Hahne (Hahn)	2,25	44 Mark 1 Schilling
Thomas Messe (Meß)	2,125	41 Mark 12 Schilling 1/2 Witten
Peter Lütken (Lütje)	2,75	56 Mark 7 Schilling 1/2 Witten
Peter Schildknecht	3	57 Mark 12 Schilling
Claus Klinkhamer	3,375	78 Mark 9 Schilling 1/2 Witten
Total	20	400 Mark 5 Schilling
