= Dorothea Maetzel-Johannsen =

German painter

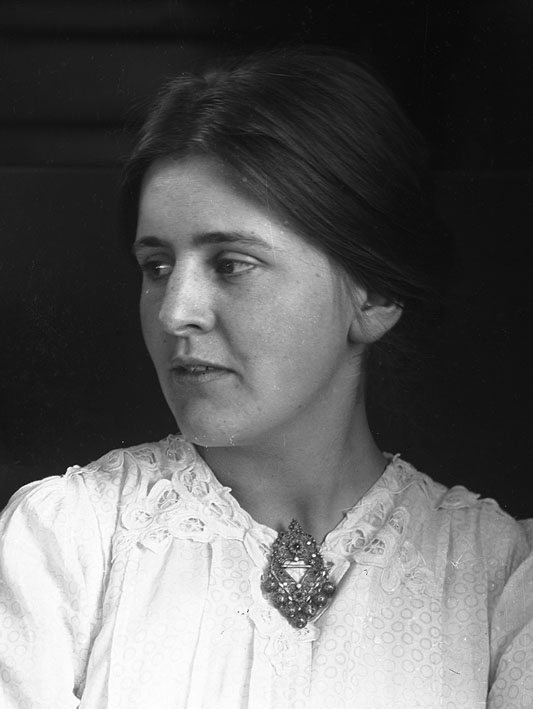
- Dorothea Maetzel-Johannsen, 1910
- Born: Dorothea Johannsen; February 6, 1886; Lensahn, Germany
- Died: February 8, 1930 (aged 44); Hamburg, Germany
- Known for: Painting
- Movement: New Objectivity
- Spouse: Emil Maetzel (m. 1910)

Dorothea Maetzel-Johannsen (6 February 1886 – 8 February 1930) was a German avant-garde painter.

== Biography ==
Dorothea Johannsen was born in Lensahn. She went to Hamburg trade school for girls. She was a teacher in Schleswig until 1910 when she married the Hamburg architect and painter de:Emil Maetzel. As a married woman, she was no longer allowed to work as a teacher in the Wilhelminian Empire and had to give up the job.

She gave birth to four children: Ruth 1911, Bogumil 1913, Peter 1915, and Monika 1917.

Maetzel-Johannsen died in Hamburg on February 8, 1930, at the age of 44 years after an operation for heart weakness. A gravestone for Dorothea Maetzel-Johannsen and her husband is located in the Ohlsdorf cemetery, Planquadrat S 12 (near Chapel 1).

== Career ==
Between 1911 and 1918 Maetzel-Johannsen traveled repeatedly to Berlin. During the First World War she took classes from Lovis Corinth. After the war, together with her husband, Maetzel-Johannsen was one of the co-founders of the Hamburg Secession.

In 1921, Maetzel-Johannsen moved into her own studio in Hamburg. Here works were made, in which she emphasized the surface effect of the paintings more strongly. At the same time she was concerned with the New Objectivity, which began to spread throughout Germany in the mid-1920s.

In 1923 she commissioned the painting for wall paintings in the Kunsthalle Hamburg. In 1925 she stayed in Paris and Chartres for six months. In France, she took a variety of new ideas for her work back to Germany, which should be used in the last five years of her work.

In 1930, Maetzel-Johannsen worked on a commissioned design for a ceiling painting in the Hamburg Planetarium, but she died before the design could be executed.

== Exhibitions ==
- 1926 Joint exhibition with the sculptor Friedrich Wield, Hamburger Kunsthalle
- 1958 "Emil Maetzel - Dorothea Maetzel-Johannsen", Kunstverein Hamburg
- 2016 Community exhibition. Empathy and abstraction. The Modernity of Women in Germany; Bielefeld Arts Hall

== Gallery ==
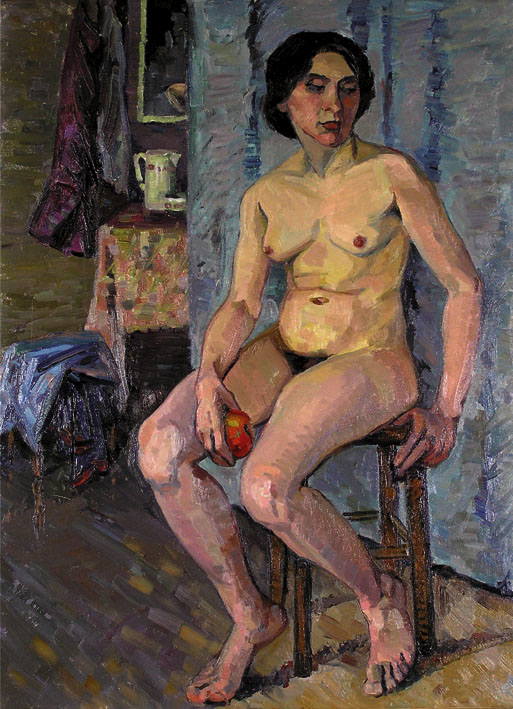
Sitzender weiblicher Akt, 1913

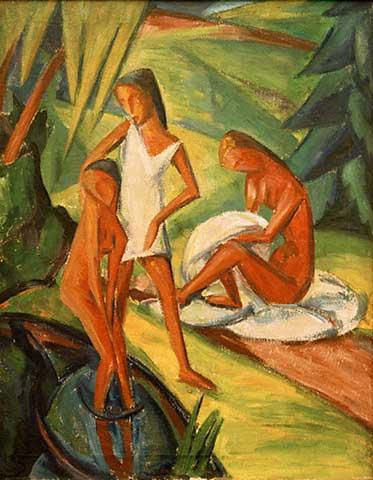
Drei Mädchen am Wasser, 1918

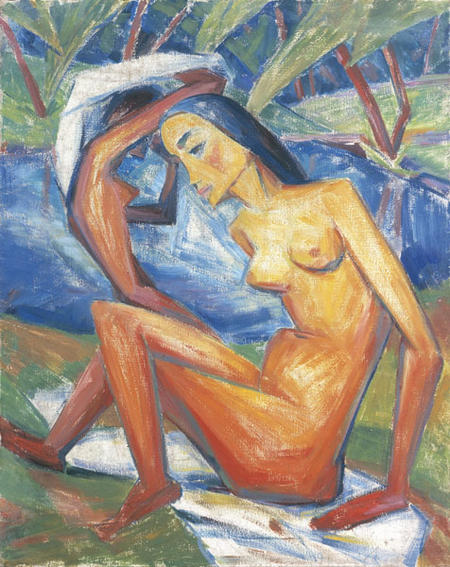
Zwei Weibliche Akte, 1919

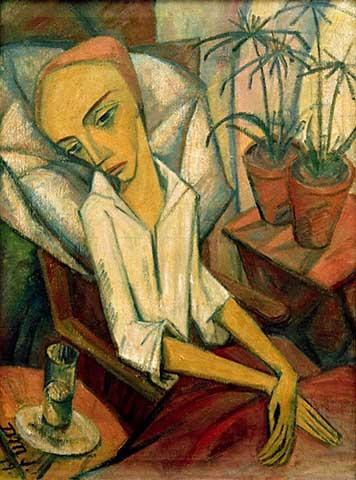
Das kranke Mädchen, 1919

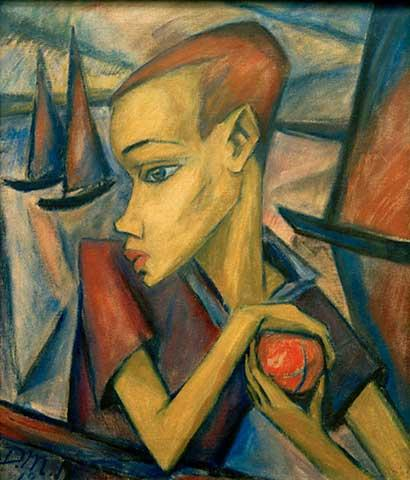
Knabe mit rotem Ball, 1919

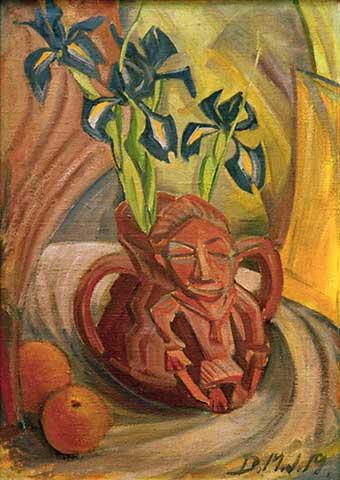
Schwertlilien und Kultgefäß, 1919

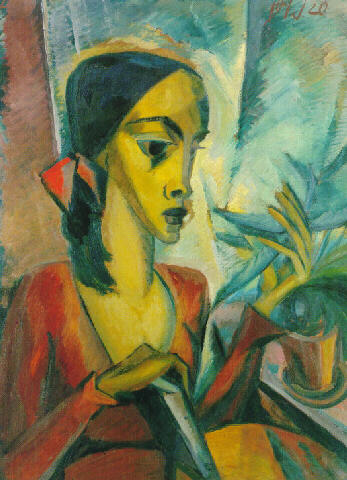
Annemarie, 1920

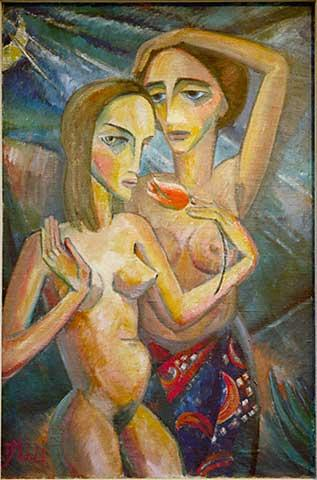
Zwei Mädchen mit Tulpe, 1921

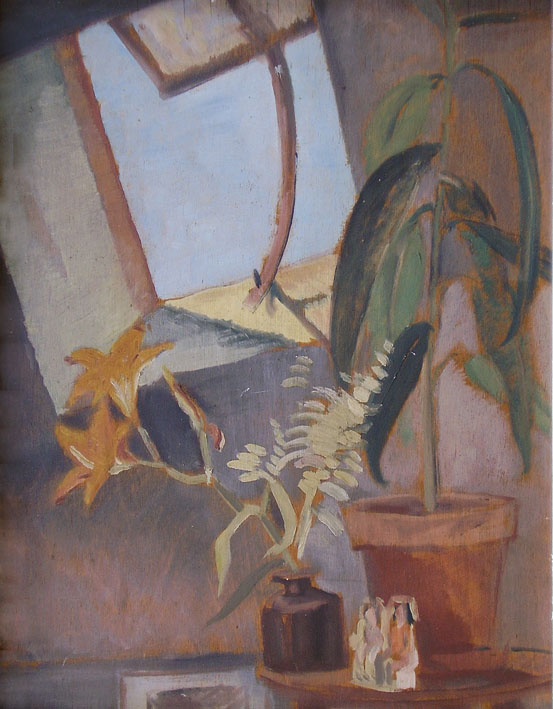
Dachfenster, 1922

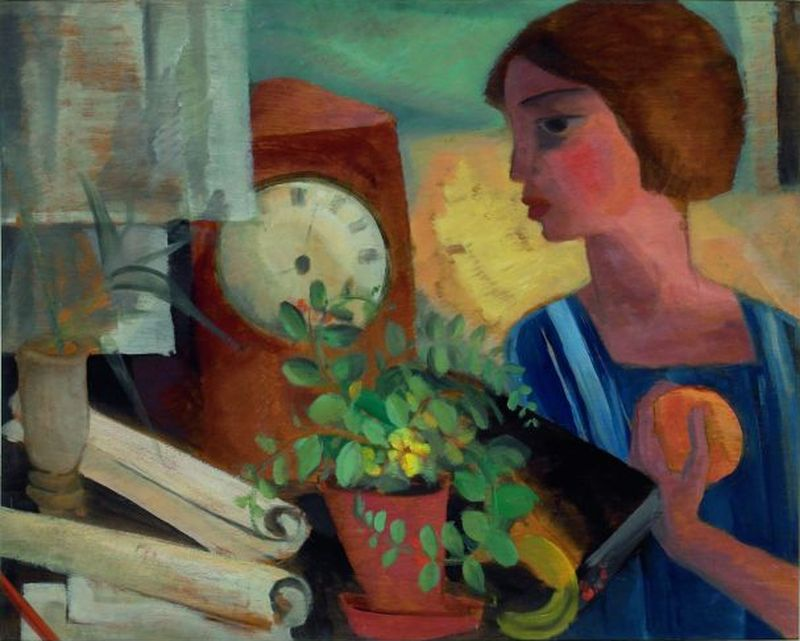
Maetzeljohannsen, 1922

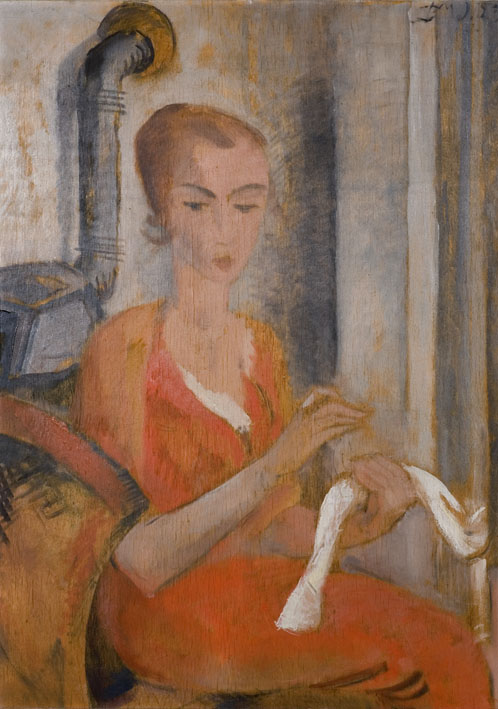
Näherin, 1923

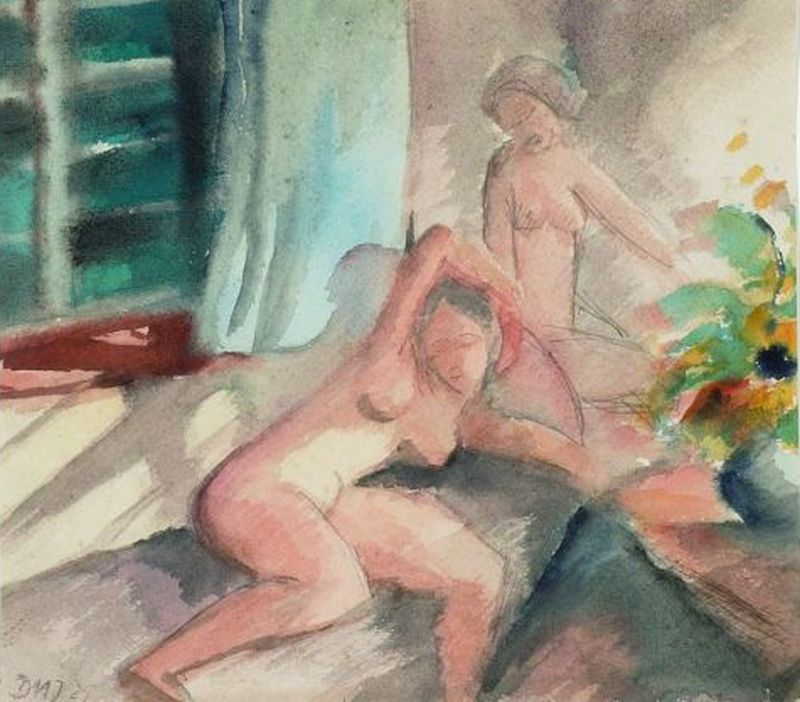
Interieur mit weiblichen Akten, 1925

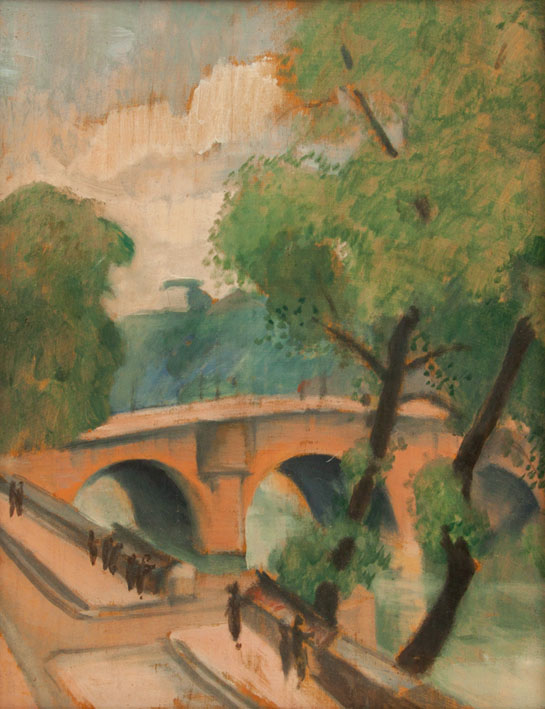
Paris, Pont Neuf, 1925

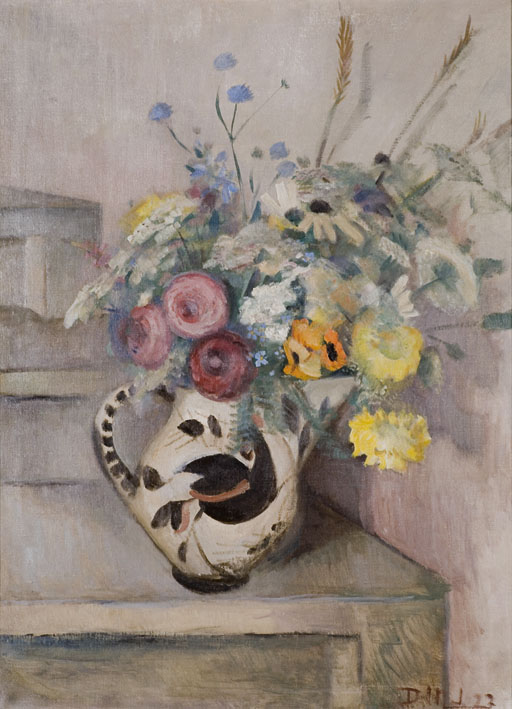
Sommerstrauß, 1927

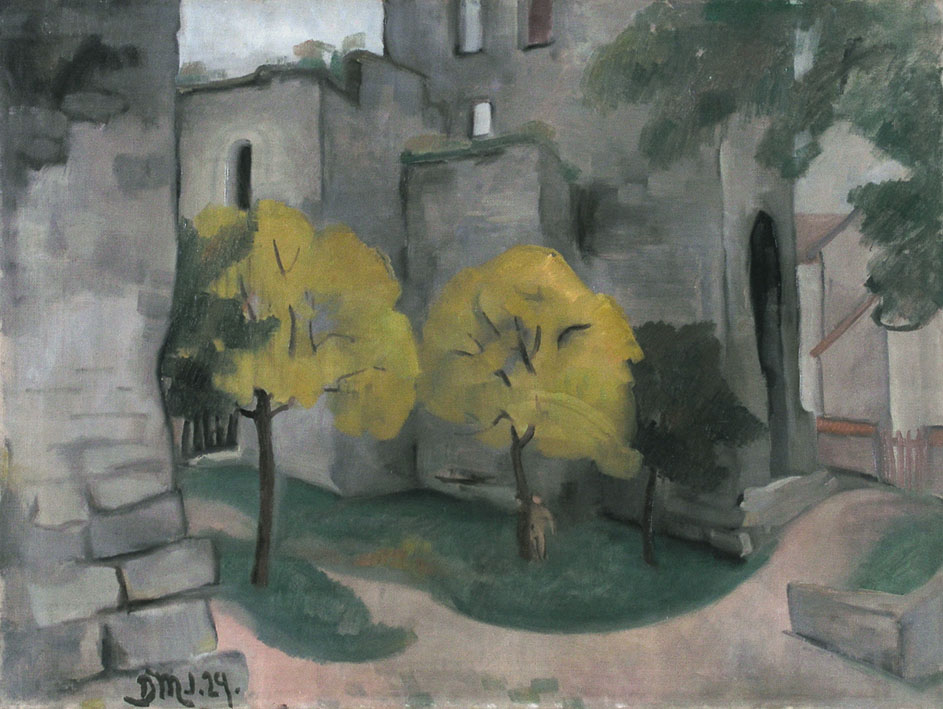
Visby – Gelbe Bäume, 1929

== See also ==
- List of German women artists
