= Heringsdorf (disambiguation) =

Heringsdorf is a municipality and town on Usedom Island in Western Pomerania, Germany, also known by the name Kaiserbad.

Heringsdorf may also refer to:

- Heringsdorf Airport, ICAO: EDAH, a regional airport near Garz on Usedom Island, Germany
- Heringsdorf, Schleswig-Holstein, a town in Schleswig-Holstein, Germany
