= Schönwalde am Bungsberg =

- Municipality
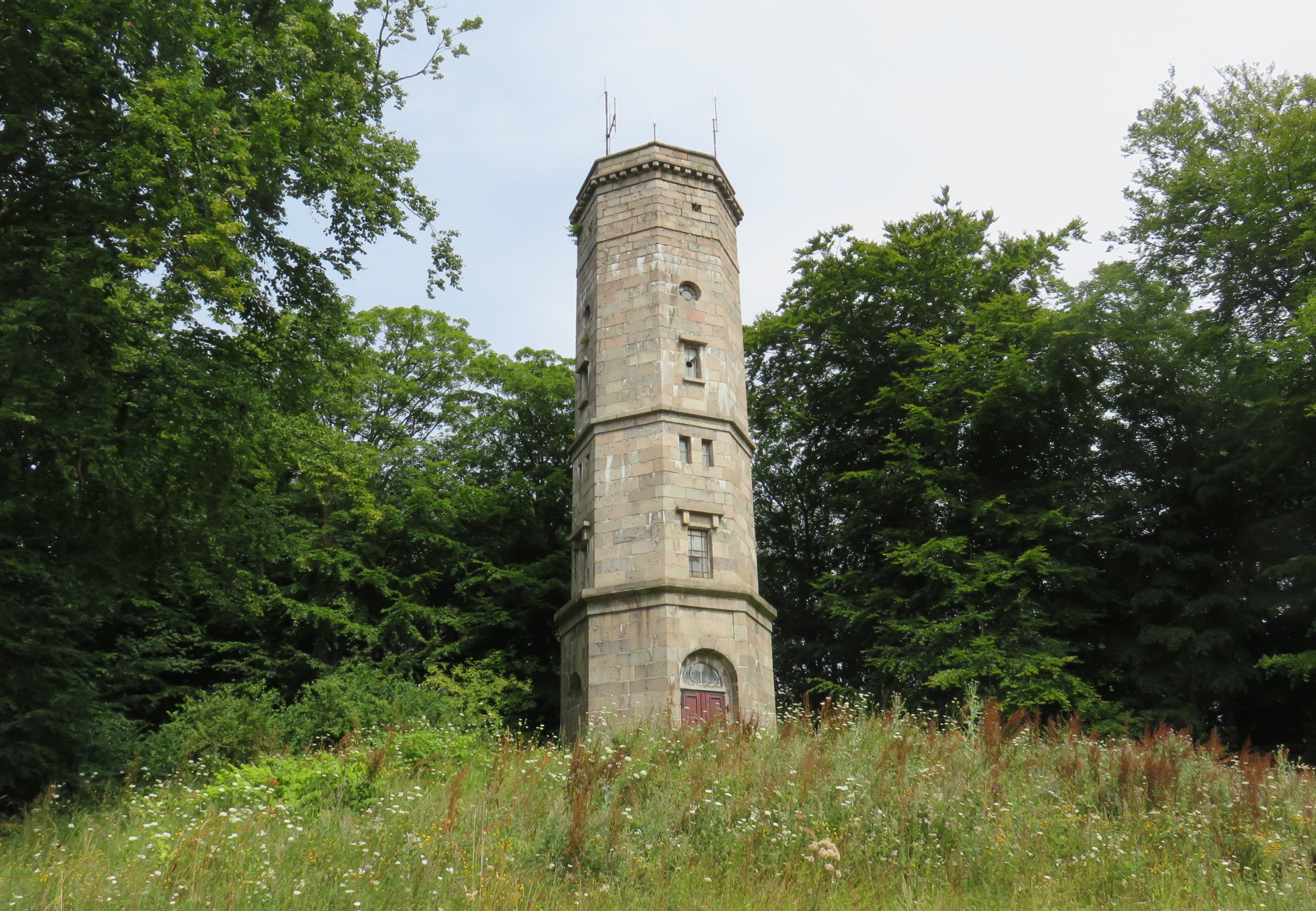
- Elisabethturm (Bungsberg) in Schönwalde am Bungsberg

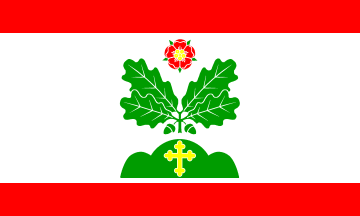
- Flag Coat of arms

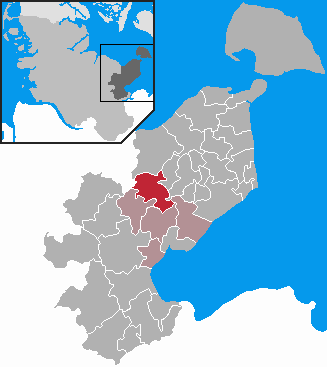
- Location of Schönwalde am Bungsberg within Ostholstein district
- Interactive map of Schönwalde am Bungsberg
- Location within Germany Location within Schleswig-Holstein
- Coordinates: 54°11′22″N 10°45′21″E
- Country: Germany
- State: Schleswig-Holstein
- District: Ostholstein
- Municipal assoc.: Ostholstein-Mitte

Government
  - Mayor: Hans-Alfred Plötner

Area
  - Total: 39.06 km^{2} (15.08 sq mi)
- Elevation: 106 m (348 ft)

Population (2025-12-31)
  - Total: 2,498
  - Density: 63.95/km^{2} (165.6/sq mi)
- Time zone: UTC+01:00 (CET)
  - Summer (DST): UTC+02:00 (CEST)
- Postal codes: 23744
- Dialling codes: 04528
- Vehicle registration: OH
- Website: www.amt-ostholstein- mitte.de

Schönwalde am Bungsberg is a municipality in the district of Ostholstein, in Schleswig-Holstein, Germany.
