= Dahme, Schleswig-Holstein =

Dahme
- Municipality
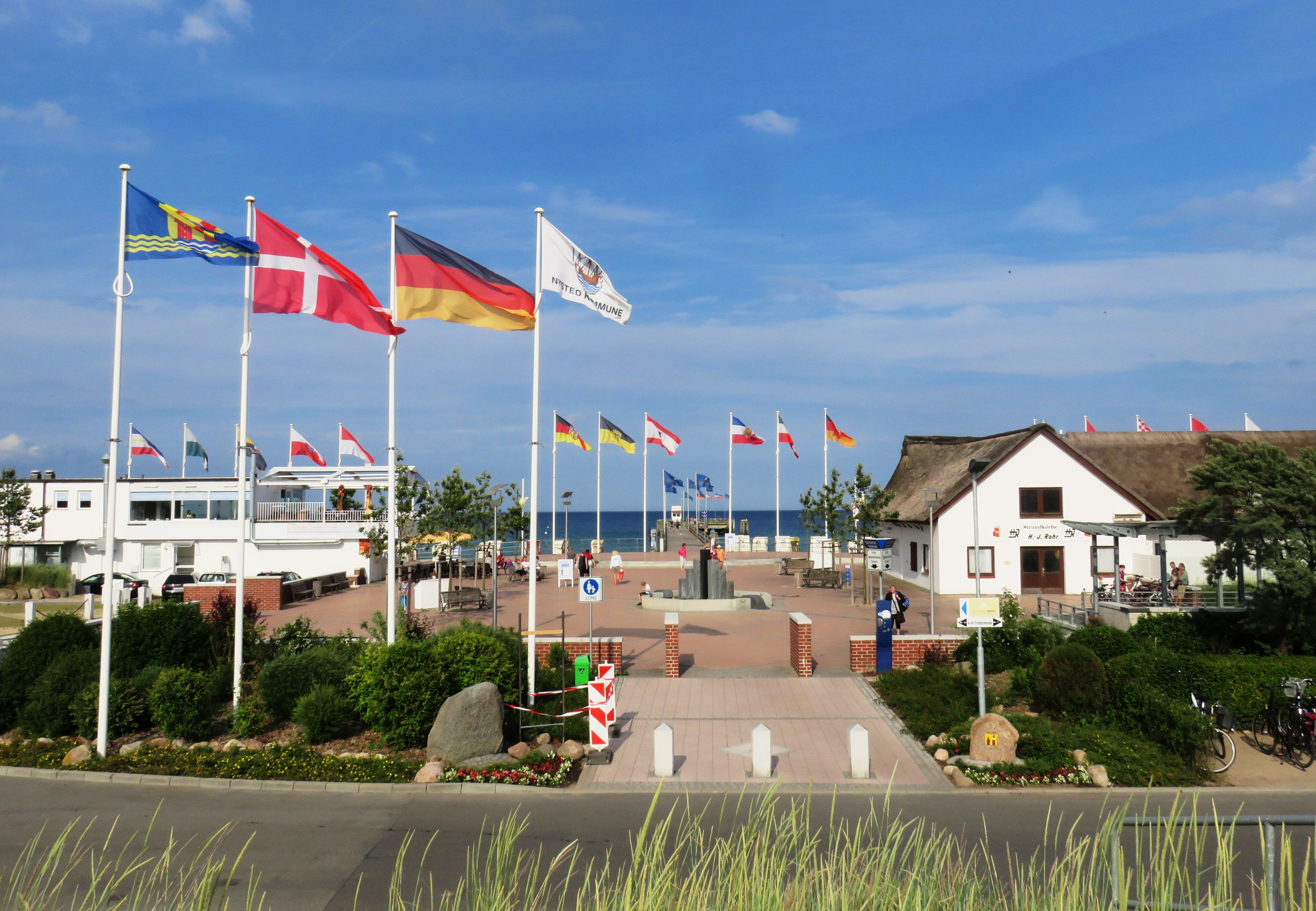
- Nystedplatz in Dahme

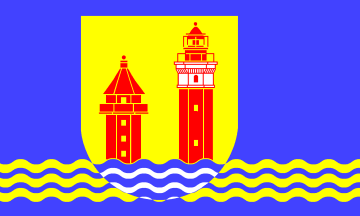
- Flag Coat of arms

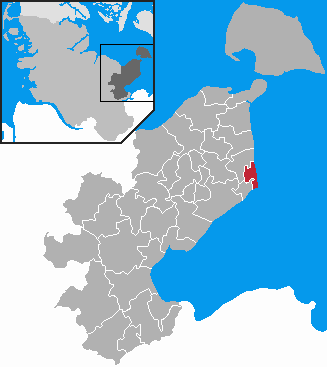
- Location of Dahme within Ostholstein district
- Interactive map of Dahme
- Location within Germany Location within Schleswig-Holstein
- Coordinates: 54°13′23″N 11°5′16″E
- Country: Germany
- State: Schleswig-Holstein
- District: Ostholstein

Government
  - Mayor: Michael Olandt

Area
  - Total: 9.11 km^{2} (3.52 sq mi)
- Elevation: 1 m (3.3 ft)

Population (2025-12-31)
  - Total: 1,214
  - Density: 133/km^{2} (345/sq mi)
- Time zone: UTC+01:00 (CET)
  - Summer (DST): UTC+02:00 (CEST)
- Postal codes: 23747
- Dialling codes: 04364
- Vehicle registration: OH
- Website: www.dahme.com

Dahme (German pronunciation: [ˈdaːmə]) is a municipality in the district of Ostholstein, in Schleswig-Holstein, Germany. It is a beach resort town on the Bay of Lübeck.
