= Lensahn (Amt) =

- Amt
- Coat of arms

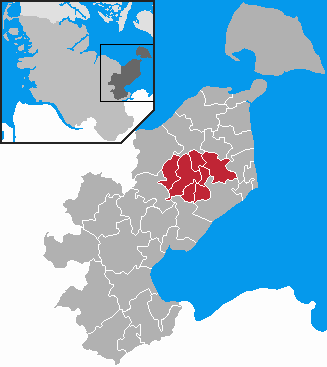
- Map of Ostholstein highlighting Lensahn
- Interactive map of Lensahn
- Location within Germany Location within Schleswig-Holstein
- Coordinates: 54°14′N 10°53′E
- Country: Germany
- State: Schleswig-Holstein
- District: Ostholstein
- Seat: Lensahn
- Subdivisions: 7 municipalities

Government
  - Mayor: Michael Robien

Area
  - Total: 104.53 km^{2} (40.36 sq mi)

Population (2025-12-31)
  - Total: 8,562
  - Density: 81.91/km^{2} (212.1/sq mi)
- Time zone: UTC+01:00 (CET)
  - Summer (DST): UTC+02:00 (CEST)
- Website: www.lensahn.de

Lensahn is an Amt ("collective municipality") in the district of Ostholstein, in Schleswig-Holstein, Germany. The seat of the Amt is in Lensahn.

The Amt Lensahn consists of the following municipalities:

1. Beschendorf
2. Damlos
3. Harmsdorf
4. Kabelhorst
5. Lensahn
6. Manhagen
7. Riepsdorf
