= Ostholstein-Mitte =

- Amt
- Coat of arms

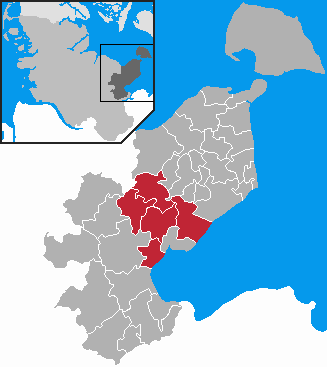
- Map of Ostholstein highlighting Ostholstein-Mitte
- Interactive map of Ostholstein-Mitte
- Location within Germany Location within Schleswig-Holstein
- Coordinates: 54°11′15″N 10°45′15″E
- Country: Germany
- State: Schleswig-Holstein
- District: Ostholstein
- Seat: Schönwalde am Bungsberg
- Subdivisions: 5 municipalities

Government
  - Mayor: Hans-Peter Zink

Area
  - Total: 170.64 km^{2} (65.88 sq mi)

Population (2025-12-31)
  - Total: 8,373
  - Density: 49.07/km^{2} (127.1/sq mi)
- Time zone: UTC+01:00 (CET)
  - Summer (DST): UTC+02:00 (CEST)
- Website: www.amt-ostholstein-mitte.de

Ostholstein-Mitte is an Amt ("collective municipality") in the district of Ostholstein, in Schleswig-Holstein, Germany. It is situated north of Neustadt in Holstein. The seat of the Amt is the village Schönwalde am Bungsberg.

The Amt Ostholstein-Mitte consists of the following municipalities:

- Altenkrempe
- Kasseedorf
- Schashagen
- Schönwalde am Bungsberg
- Sierksdorf
