= Beschendorf =

- Municipality
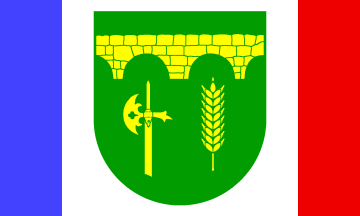
- Flag Coat of arms

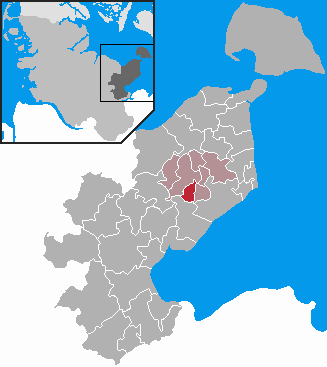
- Location of Beschendorf within Ostholstein district
- Interactive map of Beschendorf
- Location within Germany Location within Schleswig-Holstein
- Coordinates: 54°10′57″N 10°52′44″E
- Country: Germany
- State: Schleswig-Holstein
- District: Ostholstein
- Municipal assoc.: Lensahn

Government
  - Mayor: Reinhard Krönke

Area
  - Total: 8.54 km^{2} (3.30 sq mi)
- Elevation: 25 m (82 ft)

Population (2025-12-31)
  - Total: 561
  - Density: 65.7/km^{2} (170/sq mi)
- Time zone: UTC+01:00 (CET)
  - Summer (DST): UTC+02:00 (CEST)
- Postal codes: 23738
- Dialling codes: 04564
- Vehicle registration: OH
- Website: www.lensahn.de

Beschendorf is a municipality and a town in the district of Ostholstein, in Schleswig-Holstein, Germany.

In 1322, this toponym was recorded with the name of Beckendorp.
