= Grube =

- Municipality
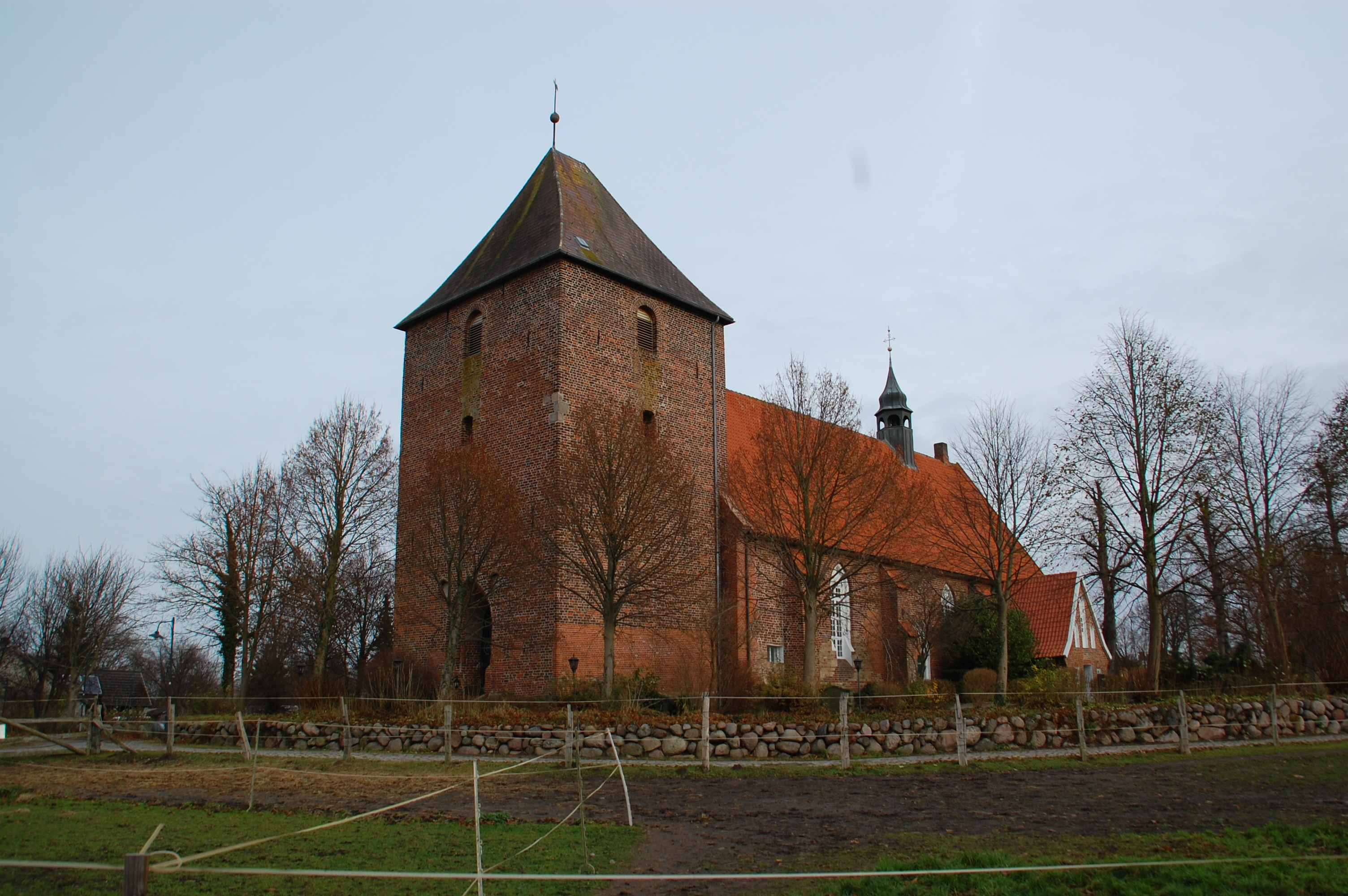
- Grube Church

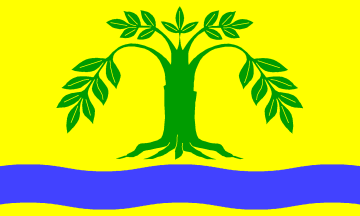
- Flag Coat of arms

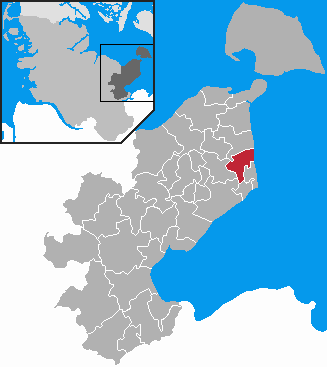
- Location of Grube within Ostholstein district
- Interactive map of Grube
- Location within Germany Location within Schleswig-Holstein
- Coordinates: 54°13′57″N 11°2′18″E
- Country: Germany
- State: Schleswig-Holstein
- District: Ostholstein

Government
  - Mayor: Volker Paasch (CDU)

Area
  - Total: 20.21 km^{2} (7.80 sq mi)
- Elevation: 2 m (6.6 ft)

Population (2025-12-31)
  - Total: 1,092
  - Density: 54.03/km^{2} (139.9/sq mi)
- Time zone: UTC+01:00 (CET)
  - Summer (DST): UTC+02:00 (CEST)
- Postal codes: 23749
- Dialling codes: 04364
- Vehicle registration: OH

Grube (German pronunciation: [ˈɡʁuːbə]) is a municipality in the district of Ostholstein, in Schleswig-Holstein, Germany. It is situated near the Baltic Sea coast, approx. 15 km south of Heiligenhafen, and 45 km northeast of Lübeck.

Grube was the seat of the Amt ("collective municipality") Grube, which was disbanded in January 2007. It consisted of the following municipalities (population in 2005 between brackets):

- Dahme (1176)
- Grube * (1047)
- Kellenhusen (1060)
- Riepsdorf (1042)
