= Lensahn =

- Municipality
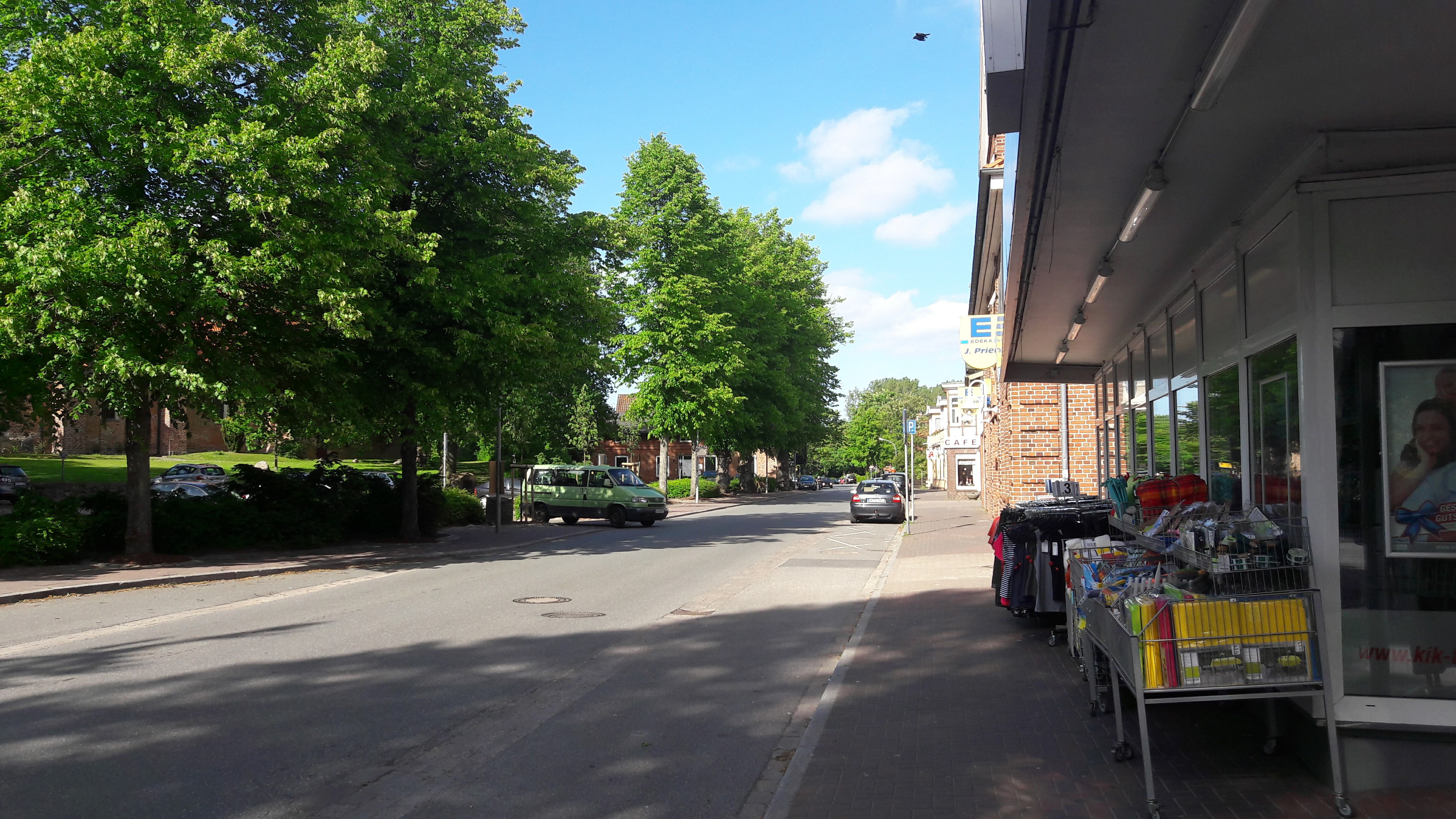

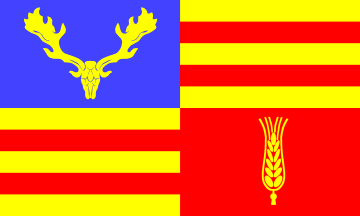
- Flag Coat of arms

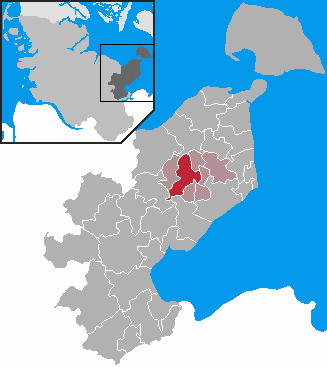
- Location of Lensahn within Ostholstein district
- Interactive map of Lensahn
- Location within Germany Location within Schleswig-Holstein
- Coordinates: 54°13′10″N 10°53′00″E
- Country: Germany
- State: Schleswig-Holstein
- District: Ostholstein
- Municipal assoc.: Lensahn

Government
  - Mayor: Michael Robien

Area
  - Total: 27.7 km^{2} (10.7 sq mi)
- Elevation: 17 m (56 ft)

Population (2025-12-31)
  - Total: 4,979
  - Density: 180/km^{2} (466/sq mi)
- Time zone: UTC+01:00 (CET)
  - Summer (DST): UTC+02:00 (CEST)
- Postal codes: 23738
- Dialling codes: 04361, 04363
- Vehicle registration: OH
- Website: www.lensahn.de

Lensahn (German pronunciation: [ˈlɛnzaːn]) is a municipality in the district of Ostholstein, in Schleswig-Holstein, Germany. It is situated approximately 9 km south of Oldenburg in Holstein, and 40 km northeast of Lübeck.

Lensahn is the seat of the Amt ("collective municipality") Lensahn.

== History ==
The oldest deed proving Lensahn’s existence dates from 1222. A purchase agreement mentioned the name Linsane and Rotbertus de Linsane as witness. The name of the place is of Slavic origin and means „Resident of the untilled new land“. Attempts to derive the name from the Lower Saxon language could not be established. Thus the older name Linsane should denote a linseed field. In 1245 the Counts of Schauenburg and Holstein started building the brick gothic village church. In 1440 Eggert von Heesten became the first documented owner of Lensahn. Ten years later in 1450 Hartwig von Buchwald purchased the manor Lensahn, followed by Mathias von Ratlau in 1460.

The church chronicles mention plague epidemics. They also confirm the steering towards the Lutheranism since 1542: the Protestant Reformation in the Lensahn duchies counted 36 yards, including Wendisch-Lensahn and Beschendorf.

=== Thirty Years' War ===
In 1622 the bell Petrus was founded. It still tolls in the church tower. Imperial forces led by Tilly looted and devastated Lensahn in 1628. In 1633 Lensahn got a new owner, Detlef Ratlow zu Lensahn. Swedish forces infested Lensahn again in 1643.

=== 18th Century ===
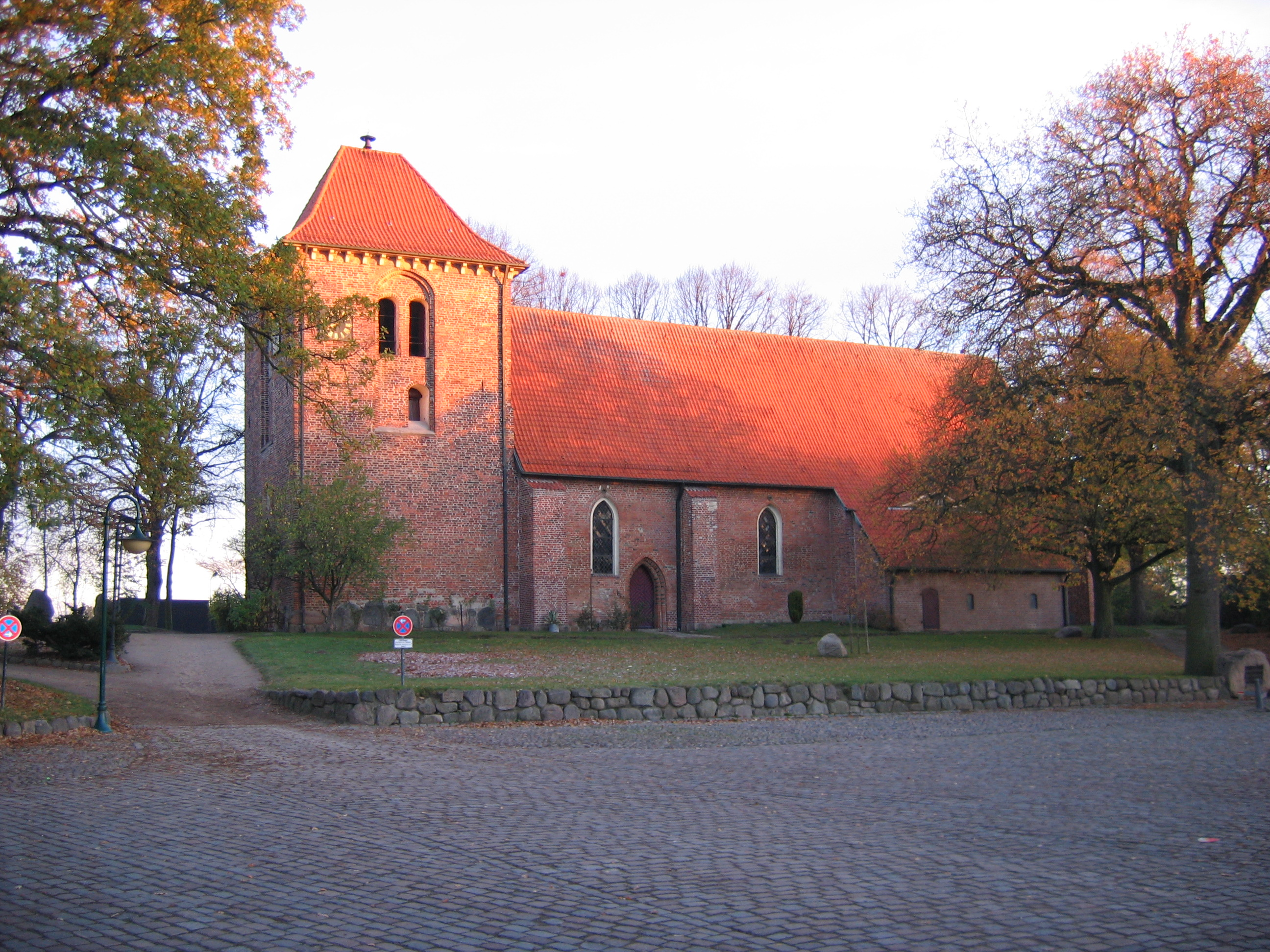
St. Katharinen

A billeting during the Great Northern War (1700-1721) had no negative impact on the now little village.

The 1760 officiating Pastor Hartmann made Lensahn a wedding paradise in Holstein. He also advertised for the introduction of the potato. 1769 the Grand Duke family became owners of Koselau, Sebent, Lübbersdorf, Kuhof, Kremsdorf, Bollbrügge, Sütel und Sievershagen (so-called „younger entailed estates“). In 1795 Duke Peter Frederick Louis let activity and industry schools (handiwork lessons for young women) be founded in Lensahn and Beschendorf. As preparation for their discharge of serfdom they were taught in practical skills like spinning, knitting, darning, sewing etc.

In 1798 by the end of the serfdom pastor Petersen founded the Ökonomische Lesegesellschaft, a society for the acquisition of agricultural literature. The farriers became leaseholders and got demise charters ruling all rights and duties.

=== 19th Century ===
In 1828 the Wagrischer Landwirtschaftlicher Verein (Wagrian Agricultural Society) was founded. It became the Schleswig-Holsteinischer Landwirtschaftlicher Generalverein in 1834. In 1832-1848 building the causeway from Eutin to Lensahn was encouraged. During the years of revolution 1848/1849 Schleswig-Holstein revolted against the danish government, a comradeship in arms was formed in Lensahn. But not until the Austro-Prussian War 1867 the Duchies Schleswig and Holstein were incorporated into the Kingdom of Prussia. The introduction of the general prussian conscription of three years led to increased emigration to the USA. In 1890 the volunteer fire department Lensahn (Freiwillige Feuerwehr Lensahn) was founded.

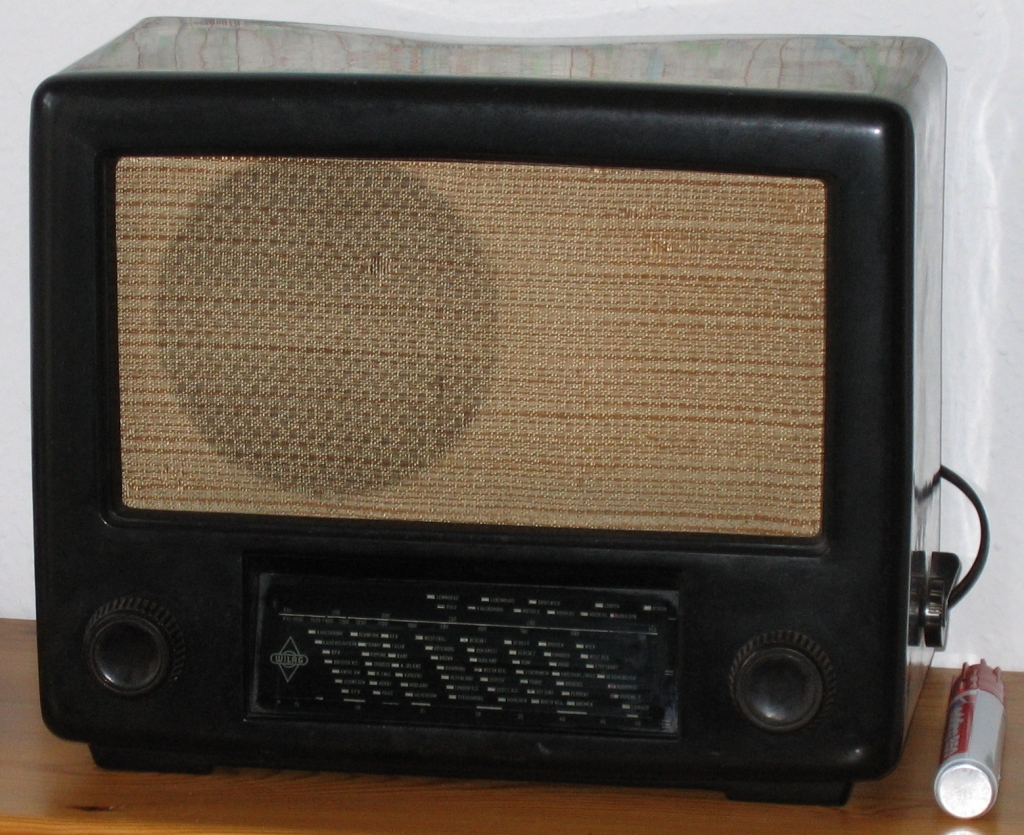
WILAG, Standard Super von 1948, Bakelite box

=== 20th Century ===
The sports club Turn- und Sportverein TSV Lensahn von 1924 e.V. was founded in 1924. During World War II its preliminary last annual general assembly took place in 1940.

1945 the Lensahn arms factories Reichsgetreidehalle and the adjacent beet slices factory passing place of the GEMA (communication medium experimental command Kiel/Pelzerhaken, GEMA factories Berlin) were dissolved. In June 1945 the Mechanische Werkstätten Lensahn (MWL) company was founded, later the Willisen-Apparatebau Gesellschaft (WILAG) as successor company (e. g. production of radios, since 1946 in buildings at Grüner Hirsch).

In 1946 the TSV Lensahn von 1924 e.V. was founded again.

After the WILAG’s bankruptcy in 1949 the Greiling-Zigarettenfabrik took over the WILAG’s factory building under construction and produced cigarettes at Grüner Hirsch. At the same place Opal’s production of tights followed. After that Transcodan (since 1984 Codan) began producing and distributing disposable medical transfer systems at Grüner Hirsch.

The Tennisclub Blau-Gold Lensahn formed in 1949.

On 1. September 1950 the Kreisfeuerwehrverband Ostholstein brought the Feuerwehrtechnische Zentrale into service.

== Politics ==
Since the council elections 2013 the CDU has 8 of 18 seats, the SPD 6 seats, the free voters FWV 3 seats and the FDP 1 seat. Citizen chief is Wolfgang Schueller (SPD).

=== Coat of arms ===
Blazon: „Divided and half vert. Thirdly 1st Azure, Or fallow deer antler on cranial bone; 2nd thirdly Gules, Or ear; 3rd thirdly Or, Gules barry.“

Lensahn’s coat of arms was permitted not until 1950. The golden ear depicts the formerly mainly agricultural character of the municipality. The fallow deer antler refers to the formerly big fallow deer population around Lensahn. Because Lensahn was part of the Gottorp and later Oldenburg entailed estates for centuries, the red crossbars of the Oldenburg coat of arms were used.

== Economics ==
Lensahn is place of business of CODAN, a German company for medical needs.

Lensahn is place of business of the German company for medical needs Gynemed, one of the leading companies in reproductive medicine.

The bank VR Bank Ostholstein Nord - Plön eG has its centre of administration in Lensahn.

== Agricultural museum Museumshof Lensahn ==
Focus of this museum are historical agriculture and crafts. The main building contains old devices of handiwork and tools. The machine hall and the land barn hold agricultural machinery (1850-1960) like tractors, combine harvesters etc. On the farm site are a well from 1797 and many devices to try out, such as grindstones and a bar to gore with muscle power. All cereal species as well as tobacco, mustard and hemp are raised here. A nature trail of 2,4 km length leads to a pond biotope and several gardens. It shows 362 different species of wood trees, bushes and 236 different old species of fruit trees.

== Sports ==
Lensahn has an open-air bath, an open-air stadium, an association football ground, a tennis ground and a great sports hall. The local sports club TSV Lensahn von 1924 e.V. is active in association football, handball, physical fitness, athletics, gymnastics, karate, table tennis, badminton, volleyball, dancesport and Nordic walking. Tennis can be played in the Tennisclub Blau-Gold Lensahn. In and around Lensahn are possibilities for equestrianism.

An ultra-triathlon competition takes place in Lensahn on a regular basis. In 1998, 2000, 2003, 2007, 2010 and 2014 the World championship of the International Ultratriathlon Association (IUTA) over the triple long distance took place, in 2001 the European championship.

== Personalities ==
=== Born in Lensahn ===
- Heinrich Mölling (1825–1888), German politician, mayor of Kiel
- Anton Günther Duke of Oldenburg (1923–2014)
- Dorothea Maetzel-Johannsen (1886-1930), painter

=== Associated to Lensahn ===
- Julius Stinde (1841–1905), German journalist and writer. Spent a part of his childhood in Lensahn.
- Hans-Karl Freiherr von Willisen (1906–1966), owner of the companies GEMA, MWL and WILAG in Lensahn
- Josias von Qualen (danish field marshal), † 1586 in Gottorp. As hereditary lord of Koselau he was buried in Lensahn’s church.

== Literature ==
- Uwe Stock: Lensahn – Geschichte eines Dorfes. Chronik der Gemeinde Lensahn. Lensahn 2003.
