= Oldenburg-Land =

- Amt
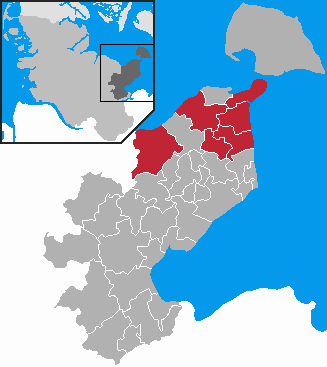
- Map of Ostholstein highlighting Oldenburg-Land
- Interactive map of Oldenburg-Land
- Location within Germany Location within Schleswig-Holstein
- Coordinates: 54°18′N 10°53′E
- Country: Germany
- State: Schleswig-Holstein
- District: Ostholstein
- Seat: Oldenburg in Holstein
- Subdivisions: 6 municipalities

Government
  - Mayor: Bernd Bruhn (CDU)

Area
  - Total: 212.70 km^{2} (82.12 sq mi)

Population (2025-12-31)
  - Total: 9,378
  - Density: 44.09/km^{2} (114.2/sq mi)
- Time zone: UTC+01:00 (CET)
  - Summer (DST): UTC+02:00 (CEST)
- Website: www.amt-oldenburg-land.de

Oldenburg-Land is an Amt ("collective municipality") in the district of Ostholstein, in Schleswig-Holstein, Germany. It is situated near the Baltic Sea coast, around Oldenburg in Holstein. Oldenburg is the seat of the Amt, but not part of it.

The Amt Oldenburg-Land consists of the following municipalities:

1. Göhl
2. Gremersdorf
3. Großenbrode
4. Heringsdorf
5. Neukirchen
6. Wangels
