= Schashagen =

- Municipality
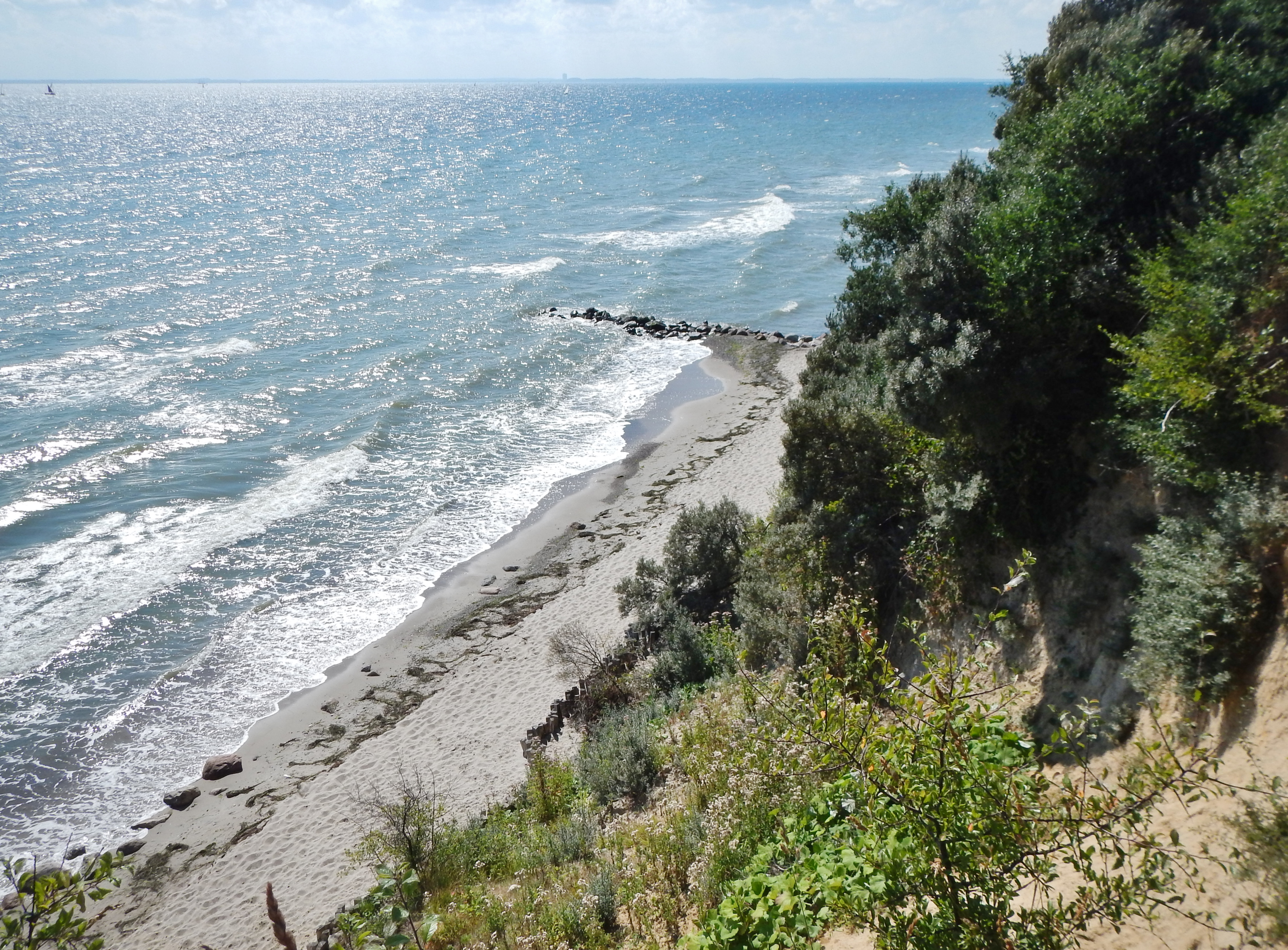
- Baltic Sea coast by Schashagen

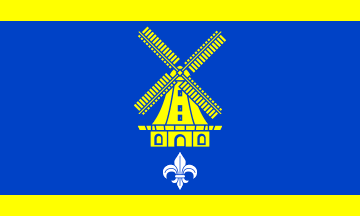
- Flag Coat of arms

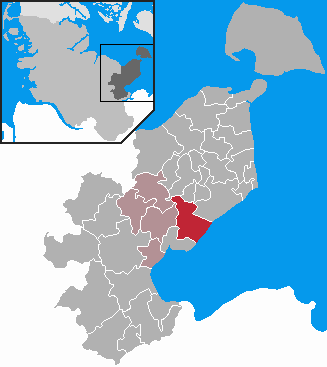
- Location of Schashagen within Ostholstein district
- Interactive map of Schashagen
- Location within Germany Location within Schleswig-Holstein
- Coordinates: 54°7′N 10°52′E
- Country: Germany
- State: Schleswig-Holstein
- District: Ostholstein
- Municipal assoc.: Ostholstein-Mitte

Government
  - Mayor: Rainer Holtz (CDU)

Area
  - Total: 41.46 km^{2} (16.01 sq mi)
- Elevation: 41 m (135 ft)

Population (2025-12-31)
  - Total: 1,973
  - Density: 47.59/km^{2} (123.3/sq mi)
- Time zone: UTC+01:00 (CET)
  - Summer (DST): UTC+02:00 (CEST)
- Postal codes: 23730
- Dialling codes: 04564, 04561, 04562
- Vehicle registration: OH
- Website: www.amt-ostholstein- mitte.de

Schashagen is a municipality in the district of Ostholstein, in Schleswig-Holstein, Germany.

== Location ==
Schashagen is located about 4 km northeast of Neustadt in Holstein on the Baltic Sea. West of the Federal Highway 1 runs from Lübeck in the direction of Fehmarn, east of the federal highway 501 Neustadt in the direction of Fehmarn.

== History ==
The Gutsbezirk Brodau was built in 1526 by Heinrich Rantzau on Helmstorf. Schashagen became official district in 1970.
