= Kabelhorst =

- Municipality
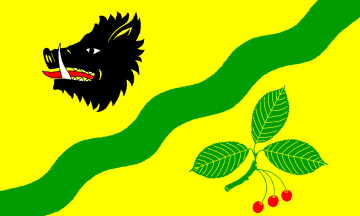
- Flag Coat of arms

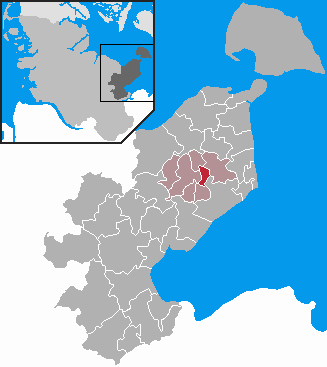
- Location of Kabelhorst within Ostholstein district
- Interactive map of Kabelhorst
- Location within Germany Location within Schleswig-Holstein
- Coordinates: 54°13′N 10°55′E
- Country: Germany
- State: Schleswig-Holstein
- District: Ostholstein
- Municipal assoc.: Lensahn

Government
  - Mayor: Hartmut Poetzel

Area
  - Total: 5.74 km^{2} (2.22 sq mi)
- Elevation: 17 m (56 ft)

Population (2025-12-31)
  - Total: 403
  - Density: 70.2/km^{2} (182/sq mi)
- Time zone: UTC+01:00 (CET)
  - Summer (DST): UTC+02:00 (CEST)
- Postal codes: 23738
- Dialling codes: 04363
- Vehicle registration: OH
- Website: www.lensahn.de

Kabelhorst is a municipality in the district of Ostholstein, in Schleswig-Holstein, Germany.
