= Damlos =

- Municipality
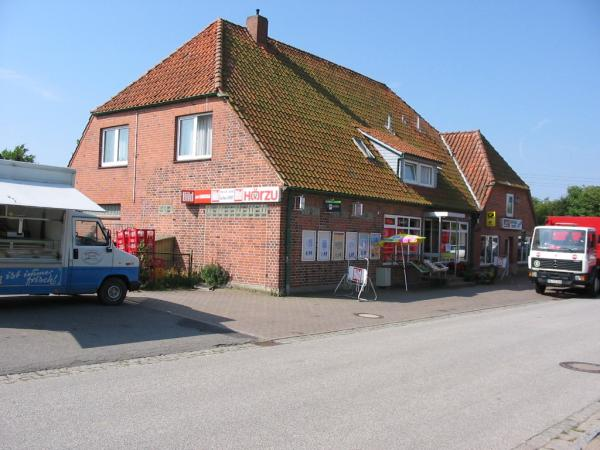

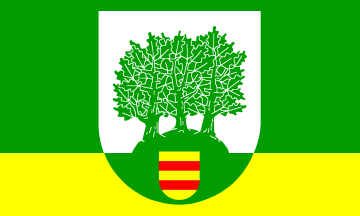
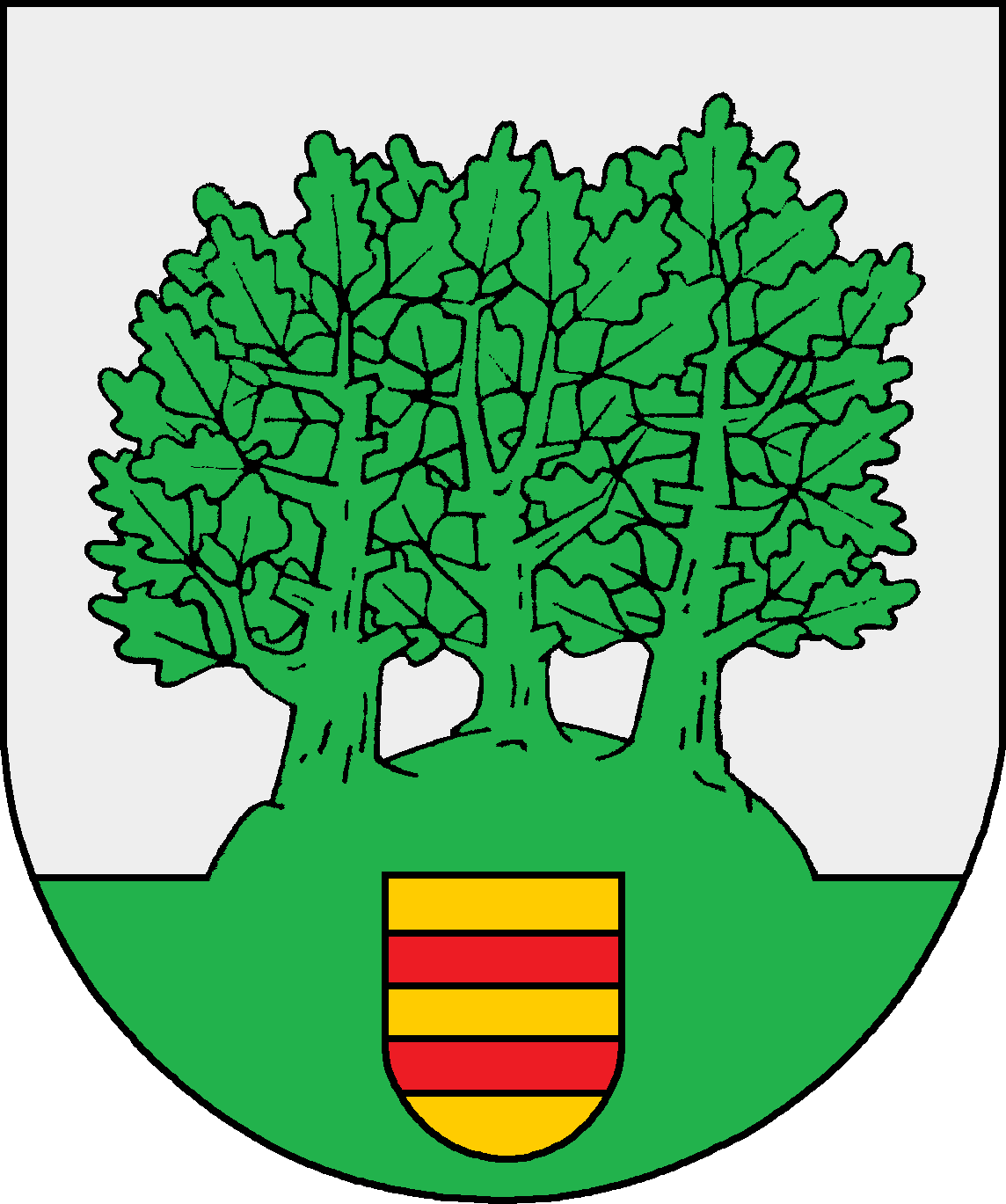
- Flag Coat of arms

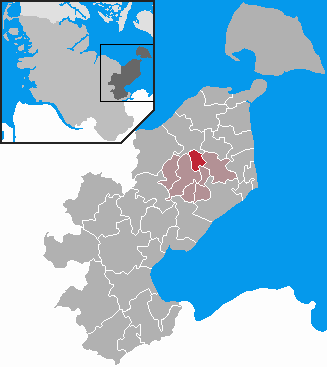
- Location of Damlos within Ostholstein district
- Interactive map of Damlos
- Location within Germany Location within Schleswig-Holstein
- Coordinates: 54°15′N 10°54′E
- Country: Germany
- State: Schleswig-Holstein
- District: Ostholstein
- Municipal assoc.: Lensahn

Government
  - Mayor: Reiner Wolter

Area
  - Total: 9.35 km^{2} (3.61 sq mi)
- Elevation: 20 m (66 ft)

Population (2025-12-31)
  - Total: 627
  - Density: 67.1/km^{2} (174/sq mi)
- Time zone: UTC+01:00 (CET)
  - Summer (DST): UTC+02:00 (CEST)
- Postal codes: 23738
- Dialling codes: 04363
- Vehicle registration: OH
- Website: www.lensahn.de

Damlos is a municipality in the district of Ostholstein, in Schleswig-Holstein, Germany.
