= Ostholstein =

Coordinates: 54°10′N 10°50′E

- District
- Flag Coat of arms
- Country: Germany
- State: Schleswig-Holstein
- Capital: Eutin

Government
  - District admin.: Reinhard Sager (CDU)

Area
  - Total: 1,392.59 km^{2} (537.68 sq mi)

Population (31 December 2025)
  - Total: 201,222
  - Density: 144.495/km^{2} (374.240/sq mi)
- Time zone: UTC+01:00 (CET)
  - Summer (DST): UTC+02:00 (CEST)
- Vehicle registration: OH
- Website: kreis-oh.de

Ostholstein (German pronunciation: [ˈɔsthɔlʃtaɪn], lit. 'East Holstein'; Danish: Østholsten) is a district in Schleswig-Holstein, Germany. It is bounded by (from the southwest and clockwise) the districts of Stormarn, Segeberg and Plön, the Baltic Sea and the city of Lübeck. Geographically, the district covers the vast majority of what is considered to be the peninsular of Wagria.

== Geography ==
The district consists of the Wagria peninsula between the Bay of Lübeck and the Bay of Kiel, the island of Fehmarn, the eastern part of the region called Holstein Switzerland and the northern suburbs of Lübeck.

Holsatian Switzerland is an area full of lakes and woody hills, which is shared with the adjoining district of Plön. The Bungsberg, though only 168 m in height, is the highest elevation in Schleswig-Holstein. The island of Fehmarn is the third largest island of Germany. Since 1963, it has been connected to the mainland by a suspension bridge.

== History ==
The district was established in 1970 by merging the former districts of Eutin and Oldenburg in Holstein. These former districts have different histories.

The District of Eutin emerged from the Principality, and later Region of Lübeck, which again emerged from the secularised prince-bishopric of Lübeck. In 1803 it became an exclave of the Duchy of Oldenburg (which confusingly has nothing to do with the Holsteinian city of Oldenburg). In 1937 it was transferred to Prussia as the district of Eutin within the Prussian province of Schleswig-Holstein.

The region of Oldenburg was a part of the Duchy of Holstein. In 1864 Holstein became subordinate to Prussia, which soon afterwards established the district of Oldenburg in Holstein.

== Coat of arms ==
The coat of arms displays:

- a cross from the arms of the bishopric of Lübeck; this bishopric existed until 1535 and owned large possessions in the region
- a tower from the city arms of Oldenburg

== Towns and municipalities ==
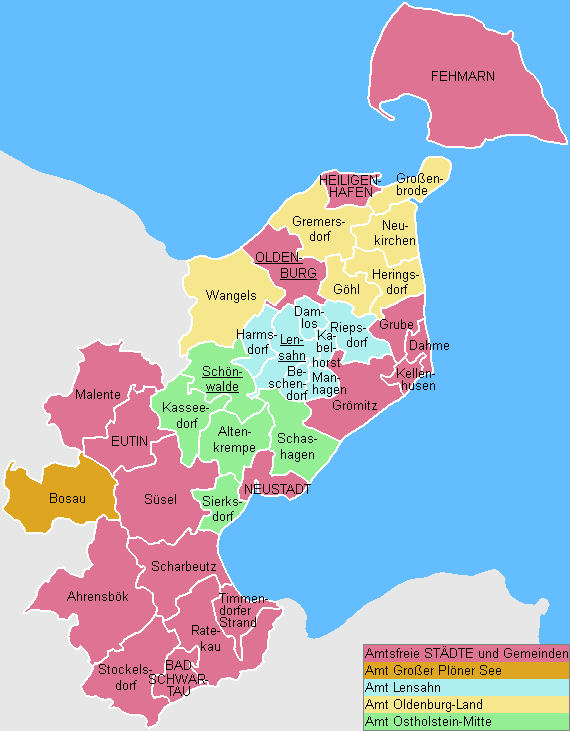

Independent towns
1. Bad Schwartau
2. Eutin
3. Fehmarn
4. Heiligenhafen
5. Neustadt in Holstein
6. Oldenburg in Holstein
Independent municipalities
1. Ahrensbök
2. Dahme
3. Grömitz
4. Grube
5. Kellenhusen
6. Malente
7. Ratekau
8. Scharbeutz
9. Stockelsdorf
10. Süsel
11. Timmendorfer Strand

Ämter
1. Großer Plöner See [seat: Plön] (the other 11 municipalities of the Amt belong to the district of Plön); 1. Bosau; 2. Lensahn; 1. Beschendorf; 2. Damlos; 3. Harmsdorf; 4. Kabelhorst; 5. Lensahn^{1}; 6. Manhagen; 7. Riepsdorf	3. Oldenburg-Land [seat: Oldenburg in Holstein]; 1. Göhl; 2. Gremersdorf; 3. Großenbrode; 4. Heringsdorf; 5. Neukirchen; 6. Wangels; 4. Ostholstein-Mitte; 1. Altenkrempe; 2. Kasseedorf; 3. Schashagen; 4. Schönwalde am Bungsberg^{1}; 5. Sierksdorf
^{1}seat of the Amt
