= Friedrich Wield =

German sculptor

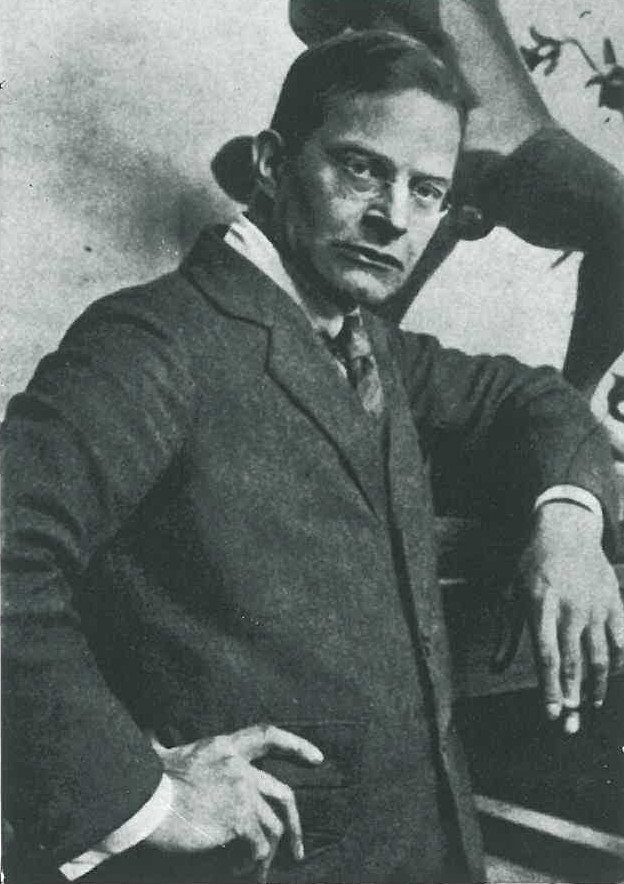
Friedrich Wield (c.1925)

Friedrich Ernst Martin Wield (15 March 1880, Hamburg - 10 June 1940, Hamburg) was a German sculptor.

== Life and work ==
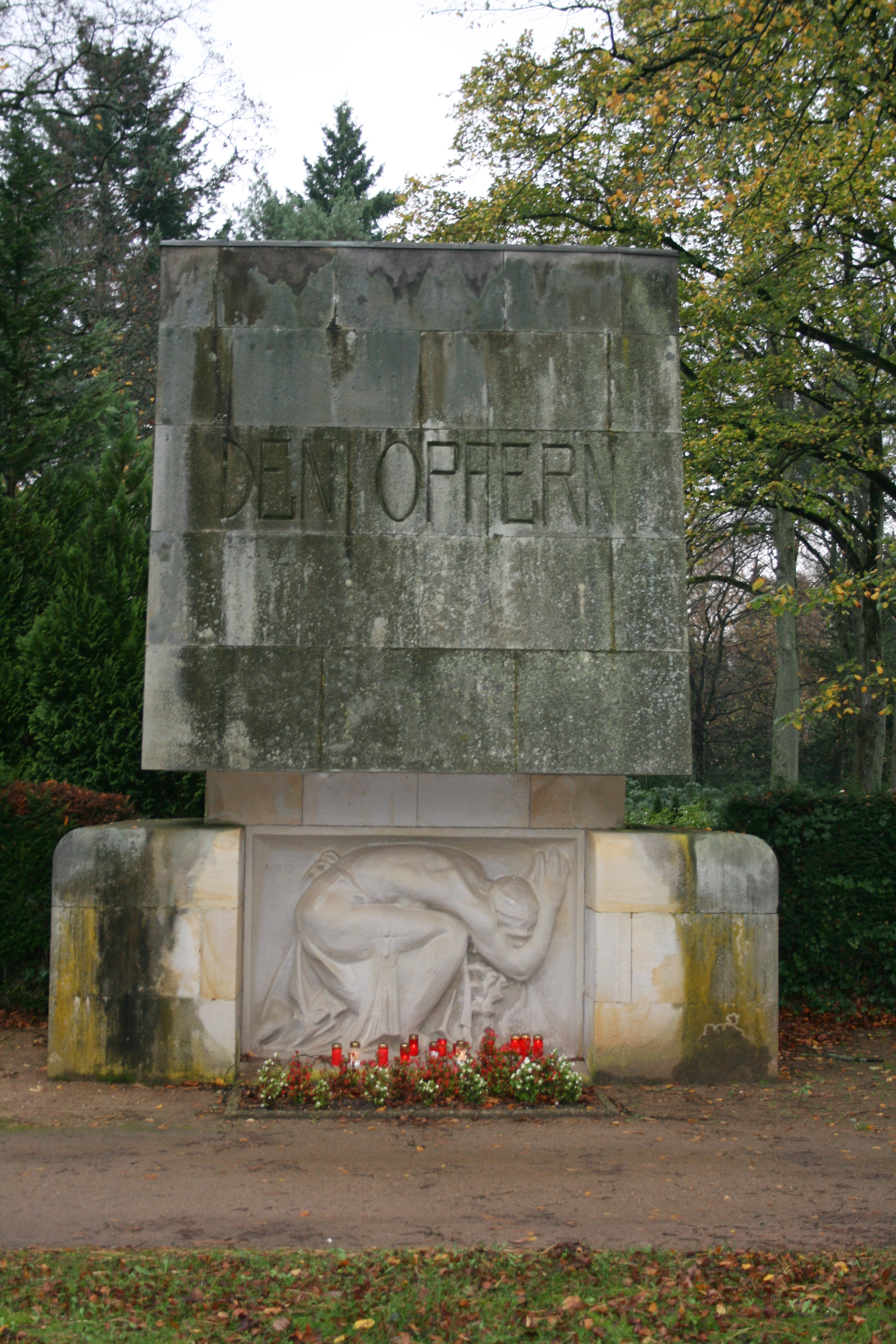
War Memorial, Bergedorf Cemetery

He was the second son born to Christian Wield, a Master carpenter, and his wife, Johanna née Deest. In 1896, after attending the Kunstgewerbeschule, he served an apprenticeship with the sculptor, Walter Zehle (1865-1940). In 1900, following a study trip to Paris, he began working with Wilhelm von Rümann at the Academy of Fine Arts, Munich. He would stay there for three years.

He returned to Paris in 1905, and opened a studio on the Rue Vercingétorix. While there, he made the acquaintance of Auguste Rodin. In 1908, he took an extended trip to Italy. The following year, he had an exhibition at the Société Nationale des Beaux-Arts. At the beginning of World War I, he found it necessary to leave France, and went to Winterthur, where he stayed with Arthur Hahnloser, a noted art collector. After being deferred from active military service in Germany, for health reasons, he returned to Hamburg, and worked in a reserve unit there from 1915 to 1918.

In 1919, he was one of the founding members of the Hamburg Secession, and served as its chairman until 1922. At that time, he left the Secession to join the Deutscher Künstlerbund and the Hamburgische Künstlerschaft. He completed several major commissions, including a memorial for the war dead in Bergedorf Cemetery.

In the early 1930s, he received a commission from the Nordische Rundfunk AG, that area's first broadcasting company, for a monument to the physicist, Heinrich Hertz. When the Nazis came to power, they cancelled the commission, due to Hertz's Jewish ancestry, and refused to pay Wield for the work he had already done. From that point on, he would experience increasingly serious financial difficulties.

Due to the restrictions on his creative freedom that had reduced him to poverty, he committed suicide in 1940. He was buried at the Ohlsdorf Cemetery. His grave was adorned with a "Crucifixion" he had created in 1938.

In 1994, thanks to efforts by the art dealer, Boris Kegel-Konietzko, his unfinished monument to Hertz was completed, from the original sketches and molds, by the sculptor Manfred Sihle-Wissel. Since 2016, it has been on display at the headquarters of the Norddeutscher Rundfunk

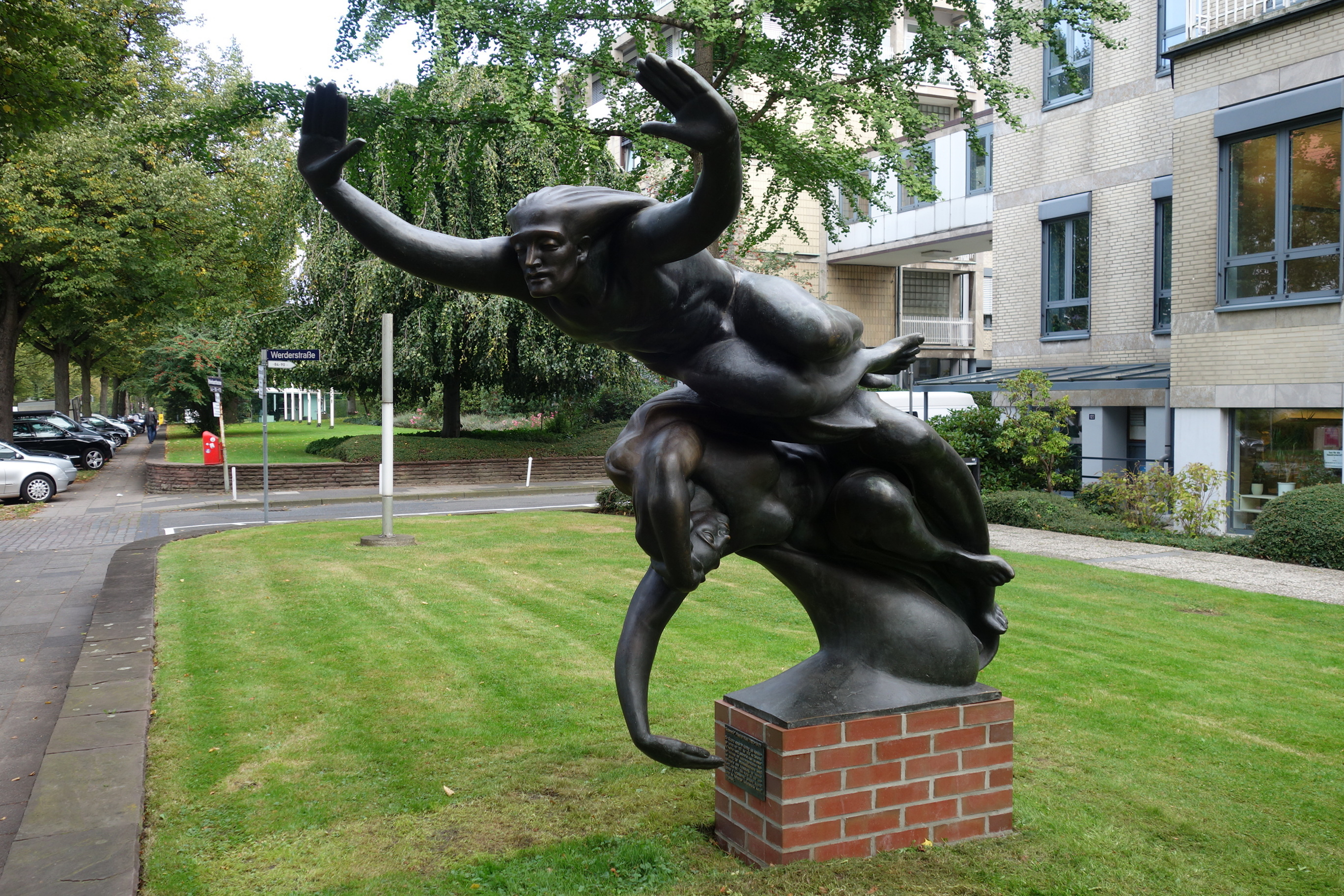
"Ätherwelle" (Etheric Wave; monument to Heinrich Hertz)
