= Riepsdorf =

- Municipality
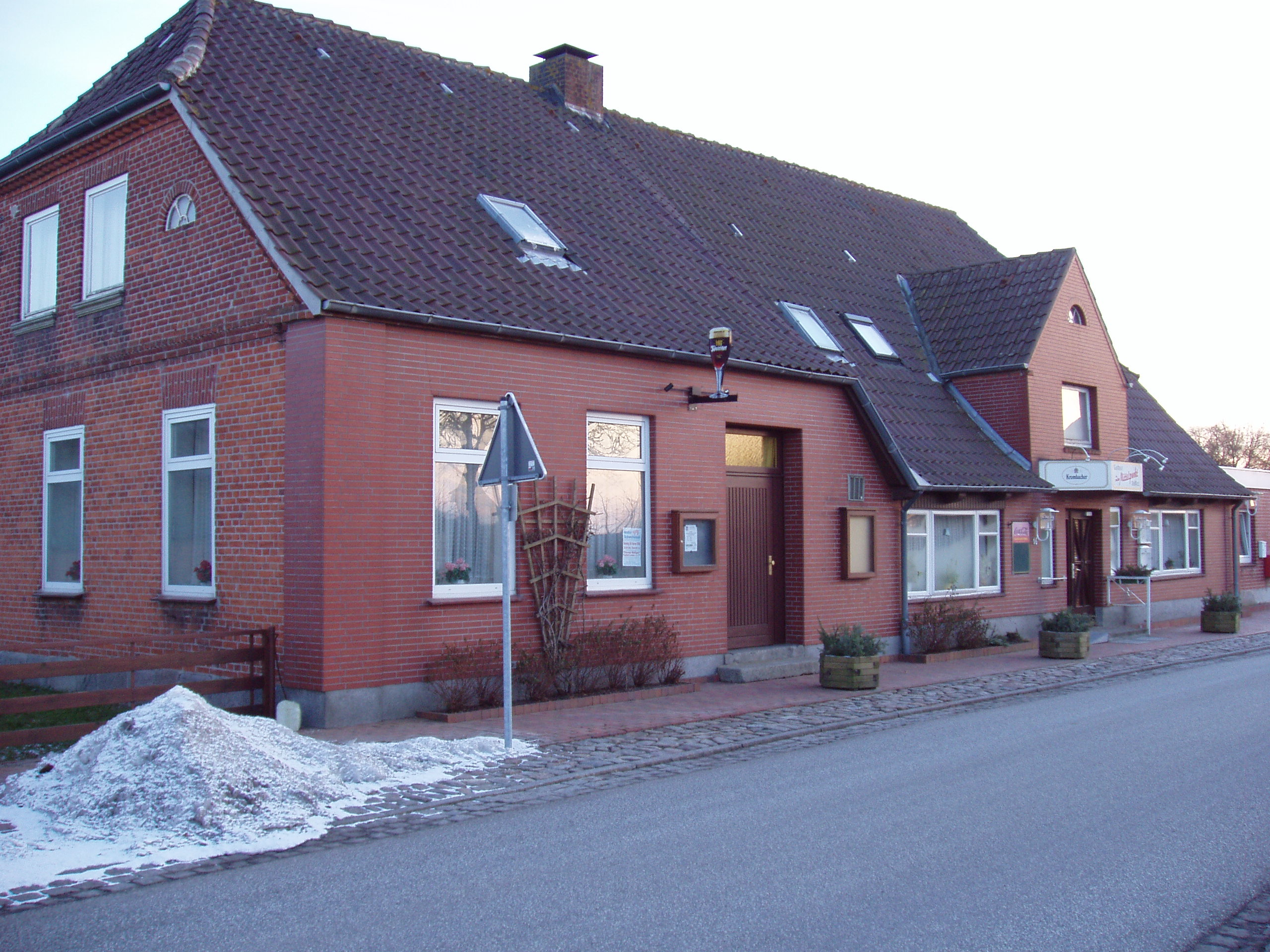

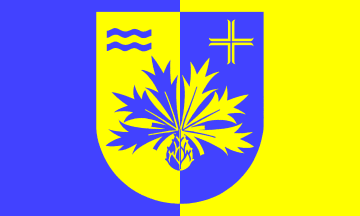
- Flag Coat of arms

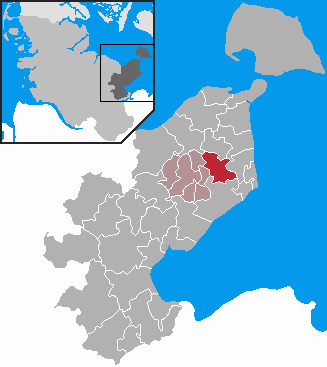
- Location of Riepsdorf within Ostholstein district
- Interactive map of Riepsdorf
- Location within Germany Location within Schleswig-Holstein
- Coordinates: 54°13′N 10°58′E
- Country: Germany
- State: Schleswig-Holstein
- District: Ostholstein
- Municipal assoc.: Lensahn

Government
  - Mayor: Heinrich Duvenbeck

Area
  - Total: 25.81 km^{2} (9.97 sq mi)
- Elevation: 9 m (30 ft)

Population (2025-12-31)
  - Total: 936
  - Density: 36.3/km^{2} (93.9/sq mi)
- Time zone: UTC+01:00 (CET)
  - Summer (DST): UTC+02:00 (CEST)
- Postal codes: 23738
- Dialling codes: 04363, 04364, 04366
- Vehicle registration: OH
- Website: www.lensahn.de

Riepsdorf is a municipality in the district of Ostholstein, in Schleswig-Holstein, Germany.
