= Gremersdorf =

- Municipality
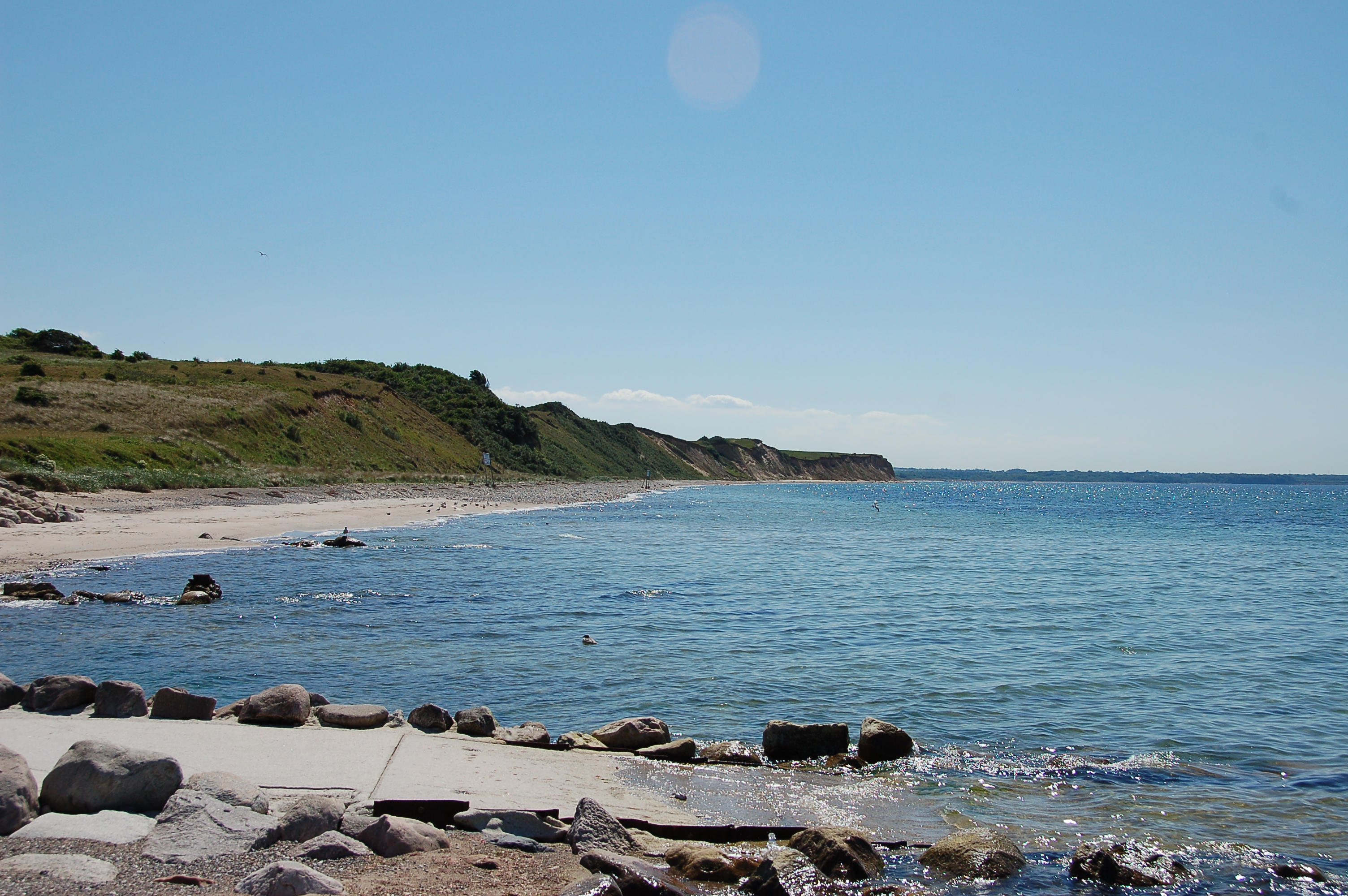

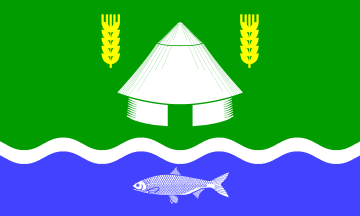
- Flag Coat of arms

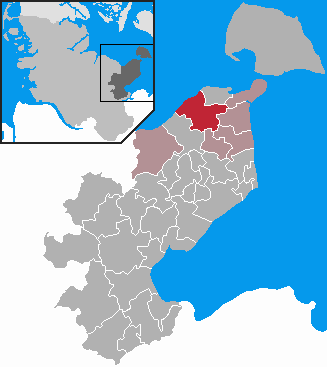
- Location of Gremersdorf within Ostholstein district
- Interactive map of Gremersdorf
- Location within Germany Location within Schleswig-Holstein
- Coordinates: 54°19′59″N 10°56′4″E
- Country: Germany
- State: Schleswig-Holstein
- District: Ostholstein
- Municipal assoc.: Oldenburg-Land

Government
  - Mayor: Henning Pries (CDU)

Area
  - Total: 45.78 km^{2} (17.68 sq mi)
- Elevation: 19 m (62 ft)

Population (2025-12-31)
  - Total: 1,594
  - Density: 34.82/km^{2} (90.18/sq mi)
- Time zone: UTC+01:00 (CET)
  - Summer (DST): UTC+02:00 (CEST)
- Postal codes: 23758
- Dialling codes: 04361
- Vehicle registration: OH
- Website: www.amt-oldenburg- land.de

Gremersdorf is a municipality in the district of Ostholstein, in Schleswig-Holstein, Germany. This municipality is next to the Baltic Sea.
