= Heringsdorf, Schleswig-Holstein =

Heringsdorf
- Municipality
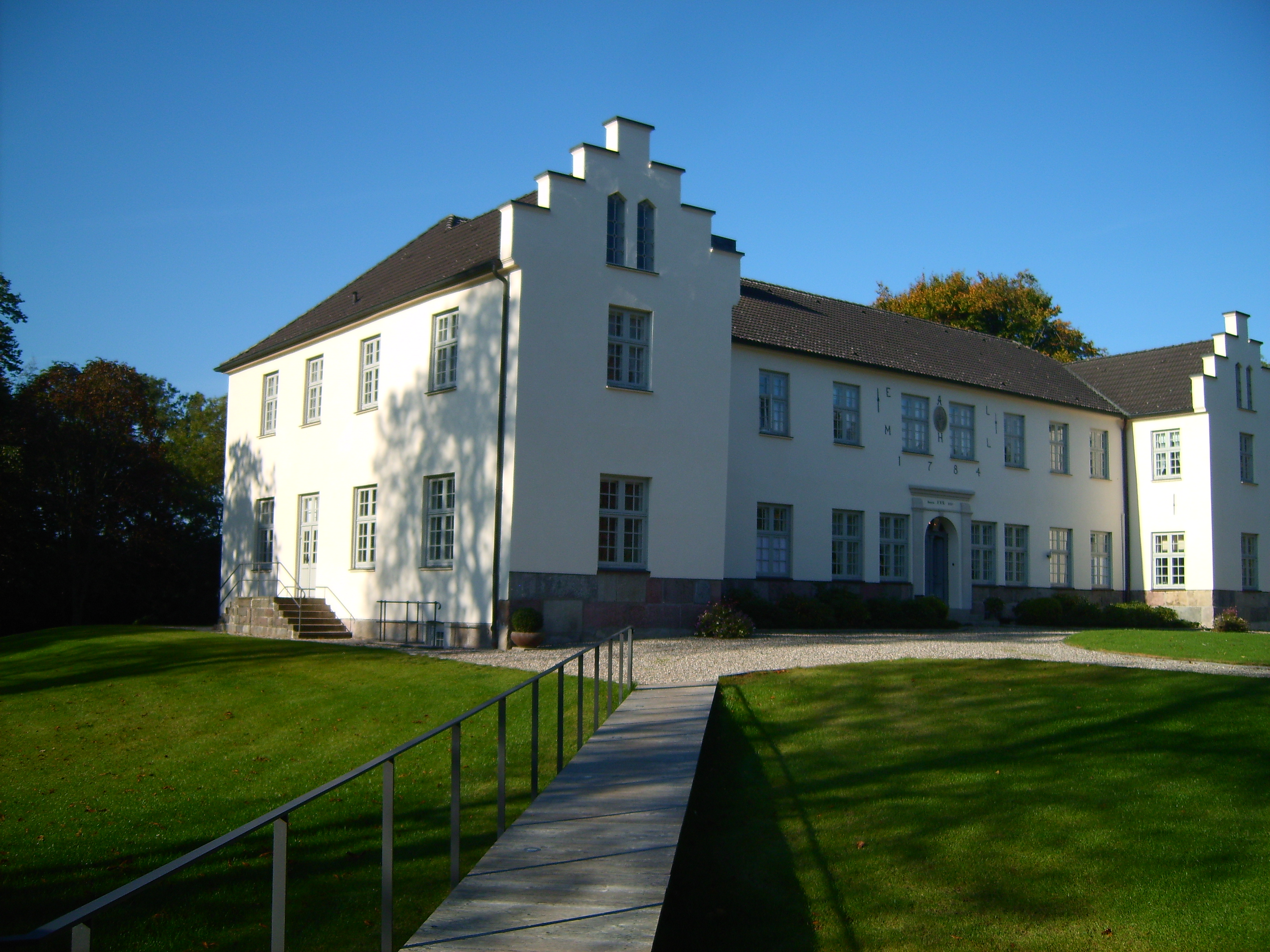

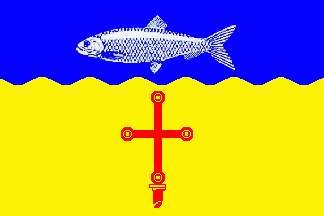
- Flag Coat of arms

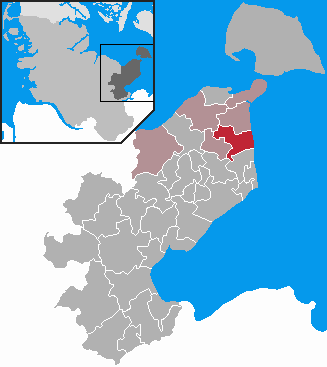
- Location of Heringsdorf within Ostholstein district
- Interactive map of Heringsdorf
- Location within Germany Location within Schleswig-Holstein
- Coordinates: 54°17′N 11°1′E
- Country: Germany
- State: Schleswig-Holstein
- District: Ostholstein
- Municipal assoc.: Oldenburg-Land

Government
  - Mayor: Jürgen Raudonus (CDU)

Area
  - Total: 29.42 km^{2} (11.36 sq mi)
- Elevation: 19 m (62 ft)

Population (2025-12-31)
  - Total: 1,162
  - Density: 39.50/km^{2} (102.3/sq mi)
- Time zone: UTC+01:00 (CET)
  - Summer (DST): UTC+02:00 (CEST)
- Postal codes: 23777
- Dialling codes: 04365
- Vehicle registration: OH
- Website: www.amt-oldenburg- land.de

Heringsdorf is a municipality in the district of Ostholstein, in Schleswig-Holstein, Germany. The municipality is next to the Baltic Sea.
