= Lübeck–Puttgarden railway =

Railway line in Schleswig-Holstein, Germany

Lübeck–Puttgarden
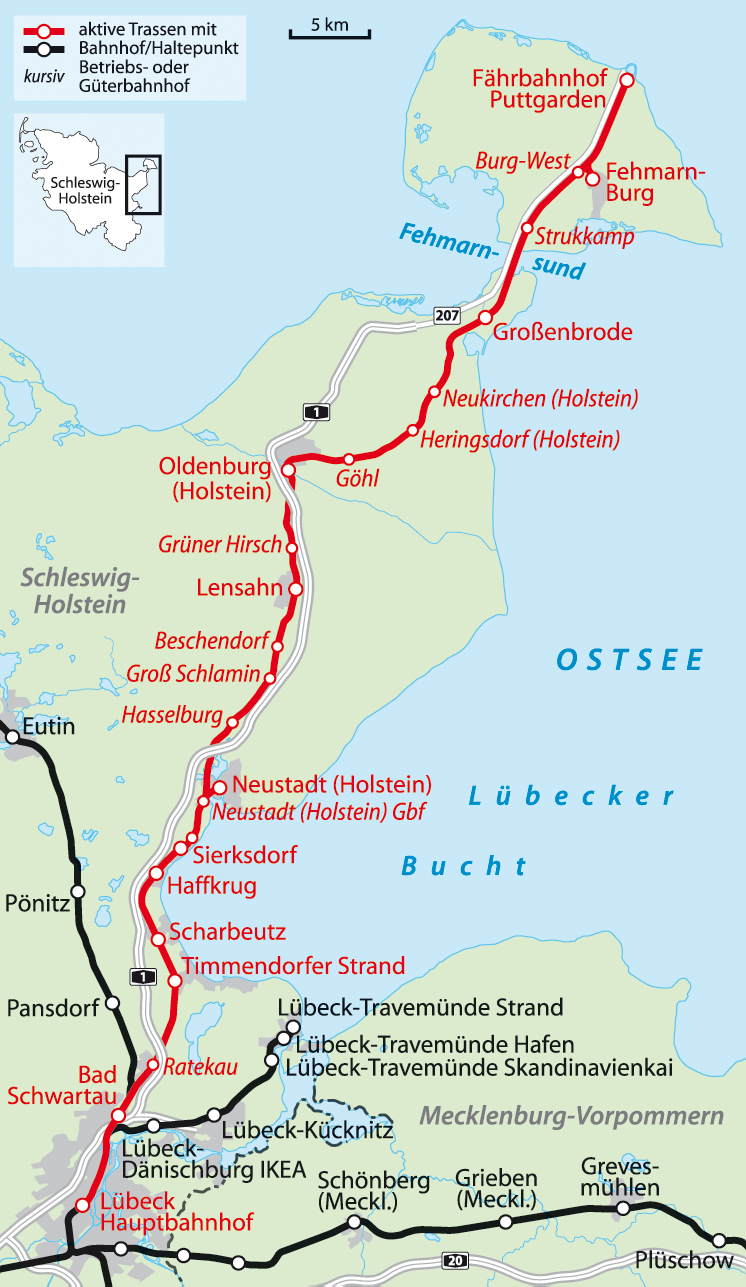

Overview
- Line number: 1100
- Locale: Schleswig-Holstein

Service
- Route number: 141

Technical
- Line length: 88.6 km (55.1 mi)
- Track gauge: 1,435 mm (4 ft 8 1/2 in) standard gauge
- Operating speed: 140 km/h (87 mph)

The Lübeck–Puttgarden railway is part of the international Vogelfluglinie (Bird Flight Line) between Germany and Denmark and connects Lübeck with Puttgarden on the Baltic Sea island of Fehmarn in the German state of Schleswig-Holstein. Until the Puttgarden–Rødby rail ferry connection was discontinued in 2019, the route was used by international long-distance trains between Hamburg and Copenhagen.

The line is now closed north of Neustadt for the construction of the Fehmarn Belt Fixed Link. The new line is not expected to be completed before 2029. The state of Schleswig Holstein and DB want to close the present coastal line and send trains via a new route inland. The connection to the seaside resorts on the Bay of Lübeck will be significantly worsened when the route is closed and is legally controversial.

== Route ==
The tracks of the Kiel–Lübeck railway are used from Lübeck to Bad Schwartau. The line then runs along the Baltic coast through Timmendorfer Strand, Scharbeutz, Haffkrug and Sierksdorf. In the Neustadt in Holstein freight yard a branch line separates and runs to Neustadt station. The main line continues through eastern Holstein and runs via Lensahn, Oldenburg in Holstein, Großenbrode and after crossing the Fehmarn Sound on the Fehmarn Sound Bridge it ends at Puttgarden station on Fehmarn.

== History ==
The first section of the Lübeck–Puttgarden line to be built was the 23 kilometre section from Neustadt to Oldenburg. This was built by the Oldenburg District Railway (Kreis Oldenburger Eisenbahn, KOE) and opened on 30 September 1881. On 17 January 1898, the line was extended towards Lütjenbrode and Heiligenhafen (20 km).

A direct connection from Lübeck to Neustadt was missing for decades, as Neustadt was only connected with Lübeck via the Eutin–Neustadt line, requiring a change in Eutin. The direct connection opened between Lübeck and Neustadt by Deutsche Reichsbahn was not opened until 1 June 1928.

=== Idea of a "bird flight line" ===
Already in the 1920s, Deutsche Reichsbahn (DRG) and the Danish State Railways (DSB) had adopted the idea of the engineer Gustav Kröhnke (1826–1904) to establish a rail ferry link across the Fehmarn Belt between Puttgarden and Rødby. Also a bridge across the Fehmarn was planned for the first time in 1921. On the German side there were by this time the line from Lübeck to Hamburg of the Lübeck-Büchen Railway Company (German: Lübeck-Büchener Eisenbahn, LBE) and the KOE from Neustadt in Holstein to Heiligenhafen. The KOE also owned the Fehmarn Island Railway (Inselbahn Fehmarn), which operated a train ferry to Fehmarn.

The first construction plans for the bird's flight line were drawn up in 1940 by Heinrich Bartmann. A formal intergovernmental agreement was signed between Deutsche Reichsbahn and the occupied Kingdom of Denmark on 8 April 1941. The LBE was acquired by the DRG on 1 January 1938. It took over the Eutin-Lübeck Railway Company (Eutin-Lübecker Eisenbahn, ELE), which owned part of the Kiel–Lübeck railway, in January 1941 and the KOE on 1 August. In September of that year construction work began, both in Germany and in Denmark. Second World War priorities brought work to a halt in 1943.

=== To 1951: Großenbrode Quay ===
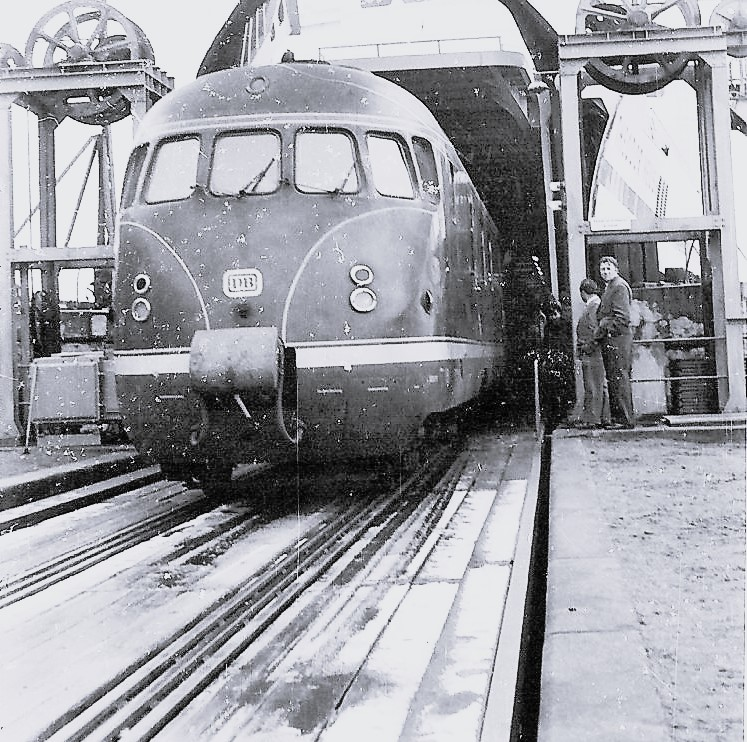
VT 12^{5} as the "Kopenhagen-Express" leavong the train ferry "Theodor Heuss" on Großenbrode Quay on 6 December 1959

Construction recommenced in 1949. The line the former KOE was modernised, a bypass curve was built around Lütjenbrode and the connecting line to bypass Neustadt was finished. A ferry terminal, Großenbrode Quay (Großenbrode Kai) was created on the grounds of the former Großenbrode airbase, which was connected by an existing siding to Grossenbrode station.

On 15 July 1951, Deutsche Bundesbahn and the DSB opened with a train ferry service between the Großenbrode Quay and Gedser on the Danish island of Falster.

=== From 1963: Fehmarn Sound Bridge ===
The construction of the connection from Großenbrode to Puttgarden on the north coast of Fehmarn began in 1958. On 14 May 1963, the Fehmarn Sound Bridge was opened in the presence of German President Heinrich Lübke and the Danish King Frederik IX. The ferry link across the Fehmarn Belt was opened along with Fehmarn Sound Bridge, creating the Bird Flight Line in its present form. The nearby train ferry across the Fehmarn Belt from Grossenbrode was closed at the same time.

The Bird Flight Line was subsequently used by many important long-distance trains such as the Nord Express and the Italia Express (Rome–Copenhagen). Added to this was busy freight traffic. Thus, for example, according to Deutsche Bahn 190,757 freight wagons used the train ferry in 1994. "D-trains" (D-Züge: long-distance expresses), the Trans Europ Express Merkur and Trans-Europ-Express-Marchandises (TEEM) international freight trains ran to Puttgarden, hauled by diesel locomotives of class 221 and later of class 218 in double traction and the large Soviet diesel locomotives of class 232.

In regional and local transport, Deutsche Bundesbahn continued to operate between Lübeck and Puttgarden with Silberling carriages hauled by class 212 locomotives, some of which ran on the branch line to Heiligenhafen and continued on to Fehmarn.

Also from 1963 to 1983 during the summer months, when the Baltic Sea was mainly used by tourists, the Fehmarn-Express ran from Cologne via the Ruhr, Westphalia, Hanover, Lauenburg and some of the resorts on the Bay of Lübeck to Puttgarden or Burg on Fehmarn. Not many seaside resorts were located on the route, so there were bus connections to, for example, Dahme and Grömitz.

Because of the heavy traffic on the single track line, it was equipped in 1971 with train radio, initially for experimental purposes. Already in the 1970s most stops between Neustadt and Puttgarden had been abandoned and were served by buses. Passenger services on the branch line from the rail triangle east of Lütjenbrode to Heiligenhafen were closed on 30 May 1976 and freight traffic on the branch was abandoned on 31 October 1984. The line is now closed.

=== From 1997 and 2019: rerouting of international trains ===
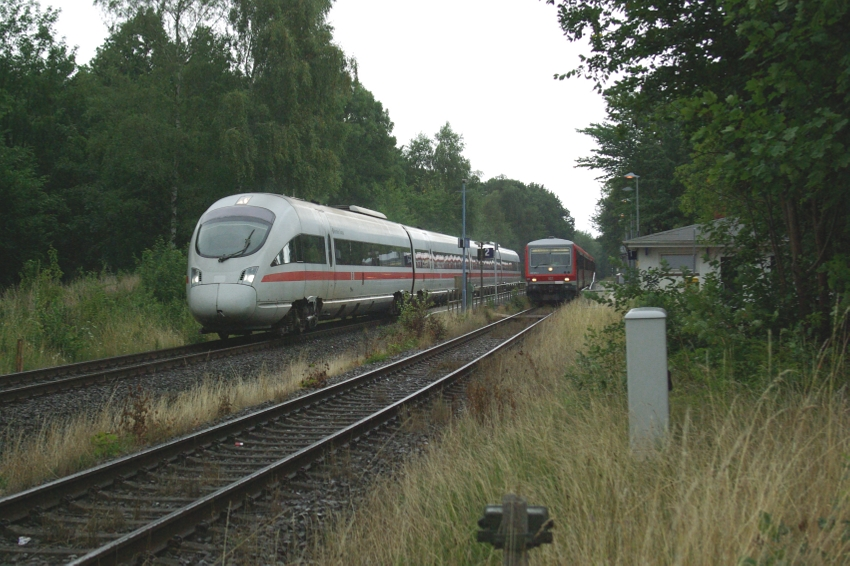
Copenhagen–Hamburg ICE passing Neustadt-Lübeck Regionalbahn service in Haffkrug station

After the commissioning of Great Belt Fixed Link between the Danish islands of Funen and Zealand in 1997, freight train traffic ended on the Bird Flight Line across the Fehmarn Belt. International freight traffic between Germany and Sweden or the Copenhagen area now runs via Flensburg and Odense. This means a detour of 160 km. Because of the reduced number of trains, the passing loops at Sierksdorf, Hasselburg and Beschendorf were closed.

From the end of 2007, ICE TD trains were used in regular service on the Berlin–Hamburg–Copenhagen route. It was decided to reopen a section of the Fehmarn Island Railway, to Burg, the largest town on Fehmarn. Construction was completed by the Easter of 2010 and the new station was finally opened at the timetable change in late July 2010. The Regional-Express trains from Lübeck have since branched off the main line at Burg-West and run to the new Fehmarn-Burg station. Some trains reverse immediately and continue on their journey to Puttgarden station; other trains return directly from Fehmarn-Burg station to Lübeck.

Since 2019, international passenger trains have gone through Flensburg, Odense and the Great Belt Fixed Link, not through Puttgarden, to enable the rebuilding of the connecting railway on the Danish side as double track. After this, only Lübeck–Puttgarden regional trains operated. These did not run over the ferry, which now only takes road vehicles.

=== From 2022: rebuilding the line and building the Fehmarn Sound Tunnel ===
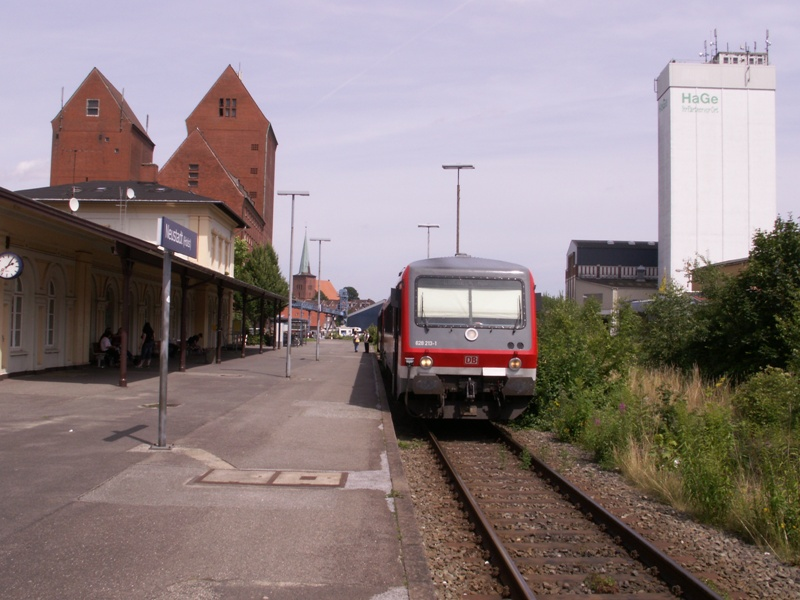
Neustadt in Holstein station

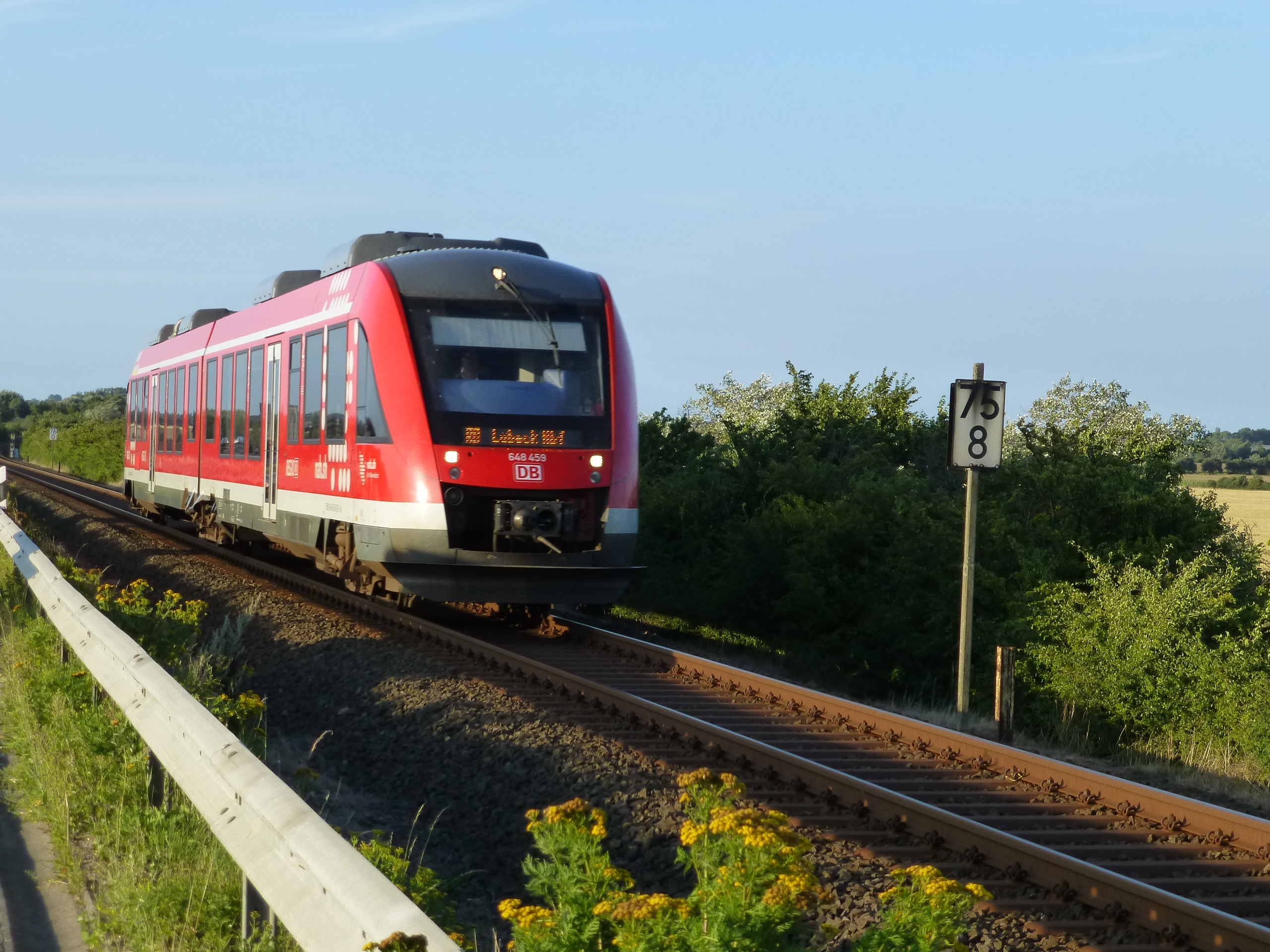
On Fehmarn, near the entrance to the Fehmarn Sound Bridge

It is planned to open the Fehmarn Belt Fixed Link in 2029 as a tunnel. A treaty in relation to the project was signed by the transport ministers of Germany and Denmark on 3 September 2008. The section from Puttgarden to Lübeck has to be electrified by the time of the completion of the new link, but the duplication of the lines is not required until seven years after the completion of the fixed link. The Fehmarn Sound Bridge may remain single track according to the treaty. A review of the project was published on 11 November 2010, which found that it would have a benefit-cost ratio of 6.7. Since then the cost has more than doubled.

Because of the increased traffic and reintroduction of freight traffic after the opening of the Fehmarn Belt Fixed Link, it was decided to construct the Fehmarn Sound Tunnel to relieve the Fehmarn Belt bridge. The line was closed north of Neustadt on 31 August 2022 for electrification and double-tracking works. The local traffic between Lübeck and Neustadt still runs.

In the Federal Transport Infrastructure Plan (Bundesverkehrswegeplan) 2030, Germany ear-marked 1.518 billion Euros for the electrification of the Lübeck–Puttgarden railway. The plans are now to stop all traffic Neustadt – Puttgarden 2022–2028 for rebuilding the route. Buses will have to be used instead of the trains on this section. Construction cost of duplicating tracks will be less if there is no traffic, so it's decided to finish it in time for the Fehmarn Belt Fixed Link, instead of waiting the seven years the treaty allows. The travel time Lübeck – Burg will be 49 minutes after reopening, 40 minutes faster than before.

The project is divided into sections, which are:

- Lübeck–Bad Schwartau (8 km) is already double track, also used by trains on Kiel–Lübeck railway. But the site has a level crossing which must be converted to a bridge, and there are requirements to lower the tracks in order to reduce noise and not raising the road much. Still in planning as of April 2024.
- Bad Schwartau–Haffkrug (16 km) will have a new railway along the autobahn. It will also be used by trains to Neustadt, so the existing line through Timmendorfer Strand will be closed. This is a result of additional planning due to new political policy. Still in planning as of April 2024.
- A new line will be built between Haffkrug and Göhl (31 km) mostly along the autobahn, but going south of Oldenburg. This section has been submitted for approval as of the end 2022. The northern part near Oldenburg was dismissed due to wish of better noise protection and resubmitted January 2024.
- Göhl–Puttgarden (32 km), except Fehmarn Sound, will mostly consist of the existing railway duplicated, although there will be a bypass of the village of Grossenbrode. There are many level crossings between Göhl and Grossenbrode which will be replaced by bridges. This section was submitted for approval as of the end of 2022, although the section Göhl–Grossenbrode needs re-planning. The first construction start of the project took place on Fehmarn on this section April 2024.
- The Fehmarn Sound Tunnel and its connection will be built. It is still being planned as of 2024. If the Fehmarn Sound tunnel is not finished when the Fehmarn Belt tunnel is completed, the Fehmarn Sound Bridge can be electrified and used during a transition period.

The following stations will exist along the new Lübeck–Puttgarden railway.

- Bad Schwartau (existing station but will need modification)
- Timmendorfer Strand/Ratekau (new station near Ratekau)
- Scharbeutz (new station near the Autobahn)
- Haffkrug (new station near the Autobahn)
  - Sierksdorf (existing station along what will be a branch line)
  - Neustadt (Holst) (existing station on the branch line)
- Lensahn (new station near the Autobahn)
- Oldenburg (Holst) (new station south of the city)
- Großenbrode/Heiligenhafen (new station between the two places)
  - Fehmarn-Burg (existing station on the branch line)

Planning has been delayed by new political requirements, mostly related to noise and vibrations, that go beyond the legal obligations and have required additional work. In total between Lübeck and Puttgarden 80 bridges will be built to separate the grade of roads and the railway. In a report given to the Danish parliament in June 2023, it is expected that the upgraded railway will be opened at the end of 2029, which is around half a year after the currently expected opening of the Fehmarn Belt Fixed Link. This plan is based on no further delay on the process of getting permission for the upgraded railway, including no appeals made to the permissions given by the authorities.

In October 2023 preparatory work such as cutting trees was started on Fehmarn. As of November 2023, it is expected that main construction work on this section will start in mid 2024. An official ceremony for the construction start of the railway took place on 7 December 2023. The proper construction work started on Fehmarn on 15 April 2024. Some other sections of the project were at this time still in planning and far from construction start.
