= Fehmarn Sound Bridge =

Road and rail bridge over Fehmarn Sound in Germany

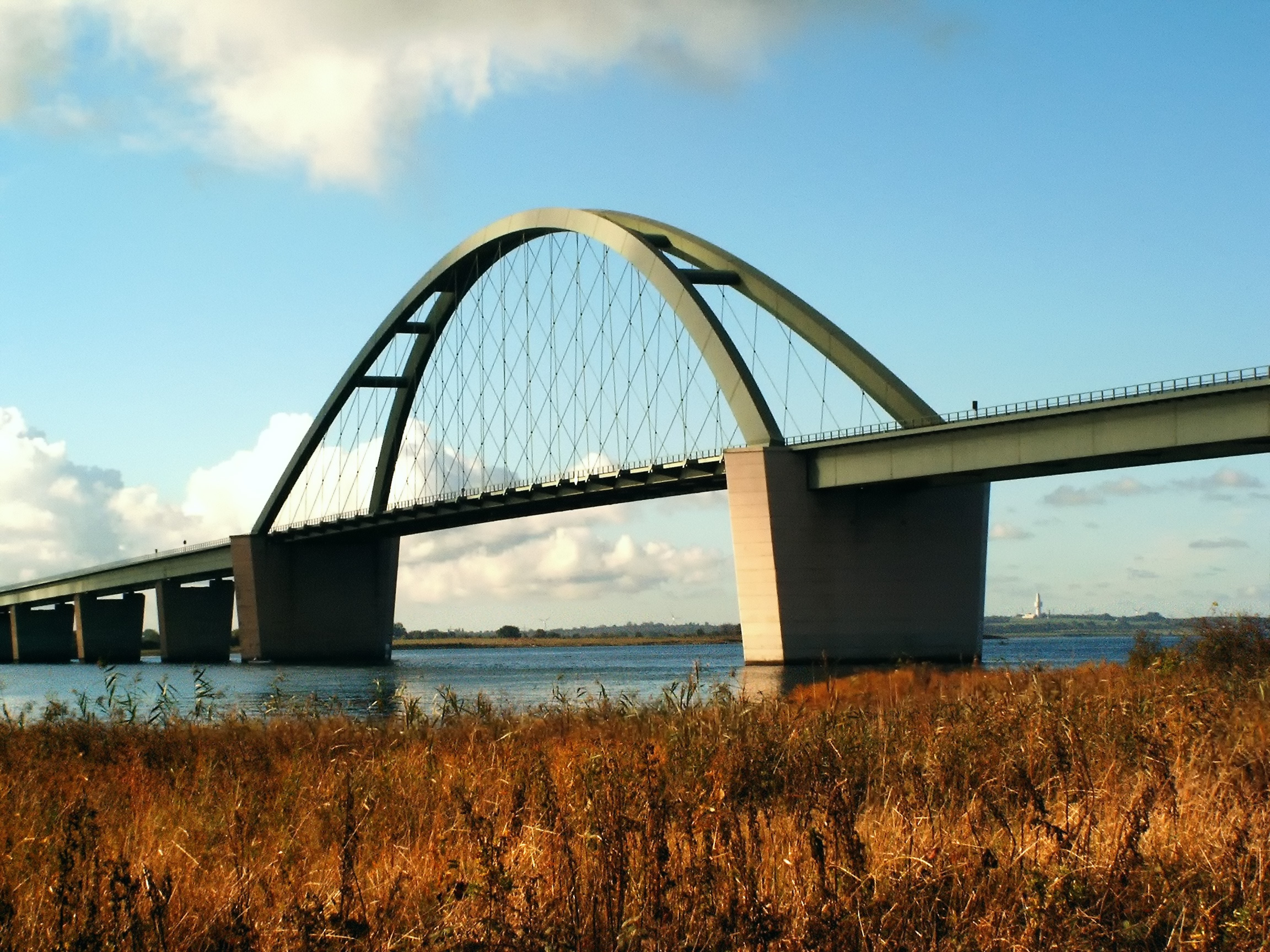
- Fehmarn Sound bridge seen from Wulfener Hals
- Coordinates: 54°24′05″N 11°06′45″E
- Crosses: Fehmarn Sound
- Official name: Fehmarnsundbrücke (in German)

Characteristics
- Total length: 963 m (3,159 ft 5 in)
- Width: 21 m (68 ft 11 in)
- Height: 67 m (219 ft 10 in)
- Longest span: 248 m (813 ft 8 in)
- Clearance below: 22 m (72 ft)

History
- Opened: 30 April 1963

Fehmarn Sound Area

The Fehmarn Sound Bridge (German: Fehmarnsundbrücke) connects the German island of Fehmarn in the Baltic Sea with the German mainland near Großenbrode.

== Description ==
The 963-metre-long (3,159 ft) crossing includes the 248-metre-long (814 ft) network arch bridge which carries road and rail over the 1,300-metre-wide (4,265 ft) Fehmarn Sound. Construction began in 1958 and the bridge was opened on April 30, 1963. The main span is 22 metres (72 ft) above the sea, which allows shipping to pass through. The bridge is constructed of steel and is 21 metres (70 ft) wide; 6 metres (20 ft) are used by Deutsche Bahn for a single rail track, part of the Lübeck–Puttgarden railway, the rest for a pedestrian walkway and two-lane roadway. The two steel arches, from which the central span is suspended by cables, are braced with steel cross-beams. The arches are 248 metres (810 ft) in length and reach 45 metres (150 ft) above the main deck of the bridge. The bridge was designed by engineers G. Fischer, T. Jahnke and P. Stein from the firm Gutehoffnungshütte Sterkrade AG, Oberhausen-Sterkrade. Architect Gerd Lohmer helped with the architectural design.

Panoramic image of the bridge as seen from southeast

The bridge was renovated in 2023, including a replacement of all steel wires.

== Route and ferry changes ==
At the same time as the opening of the bridge, changes were made to ferry services. The previous ferry service to the island of Fehmarn was discontinued. The service from Großenbrode Quay, Germany to Gedser, Denmark, crossing both Fehmarn Sound and the Fehmarn Belt, was replaced with a new service from Puttgarden (on Fehmarn) to Rødby, Denmark crossing just the Fehmarn Belt. The new bridge and ferry changes brought about a substantial time saving for both road and rail traffic along the so-called Vogelfluglinie (literally "bird flight line") from Hamburg to Copenhagen.

== Historic monument ==
The Fehmarn Sound bridge was declared a historic monument in 1999 by the State Office for Protection of Historical Monuments of Schleswig-Holstein in Kiel, and has since become a symbol of both Fehmarn and Schleswig-Holstein.

== Cold War explosive charges ==
As the bridge was built during the Cold War, six explosive vaults were embedded below the approach road on the mainland side to be used in case of invasion. Their location is given away even today by six square asphalt patches. The vaults were connected to a control point about 1 km (0.6 mi) away in Heinrichsruh.

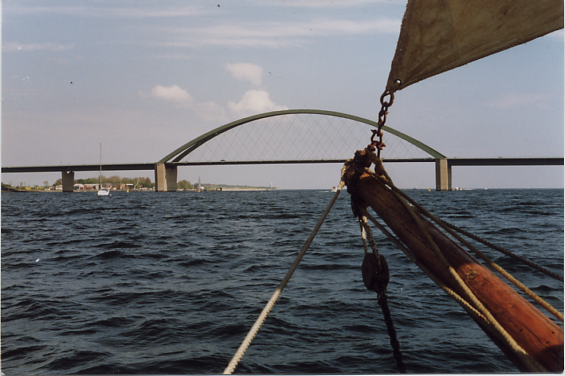
Fehmarn Sound bridge viewed from the west

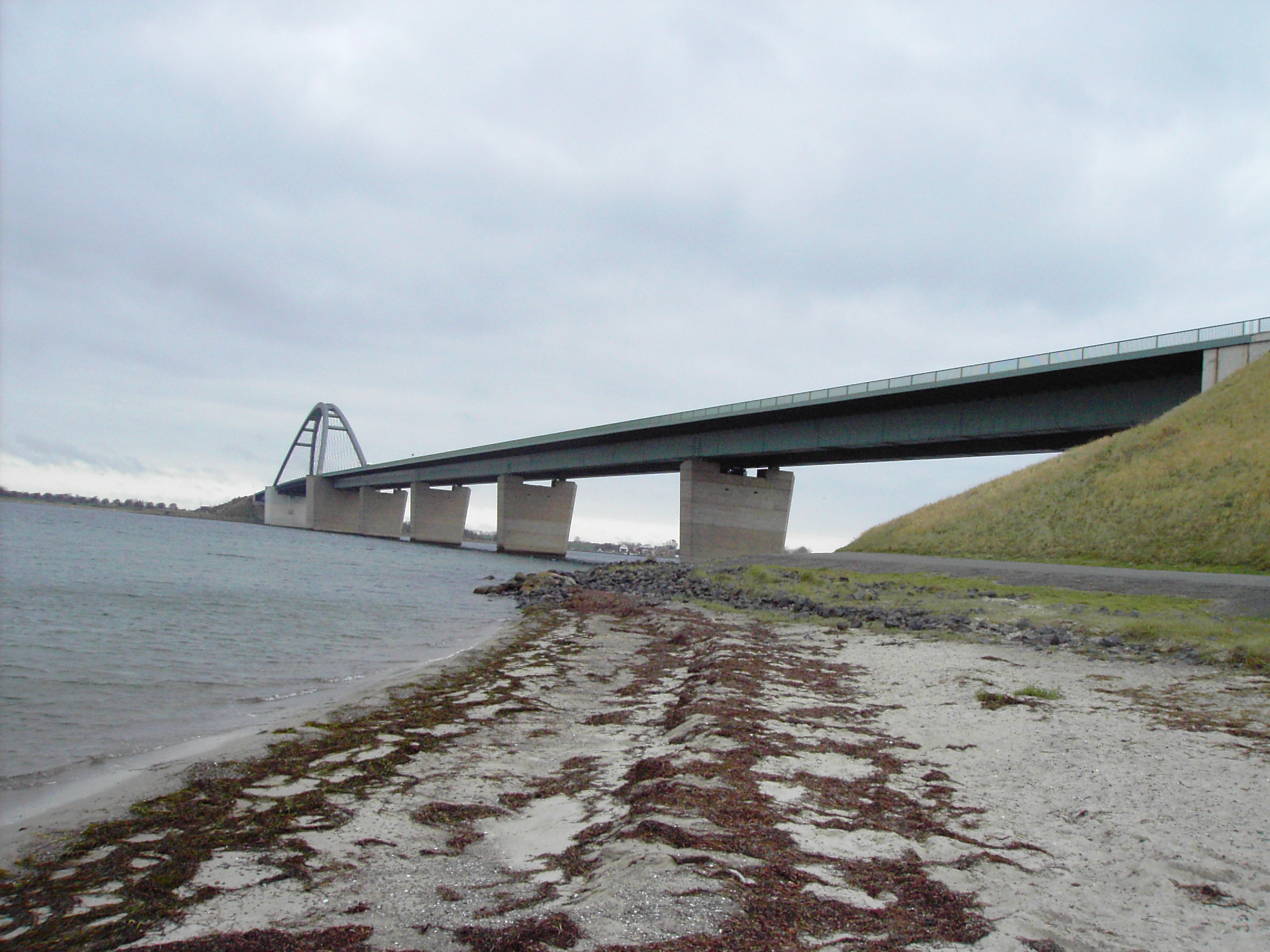
Fehmarn Sound bridge viewed from land (from south)

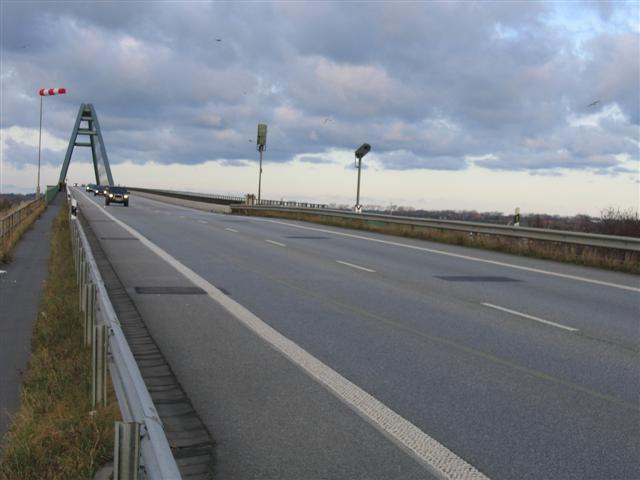
Six asphalt patches over former explosive charge vaults

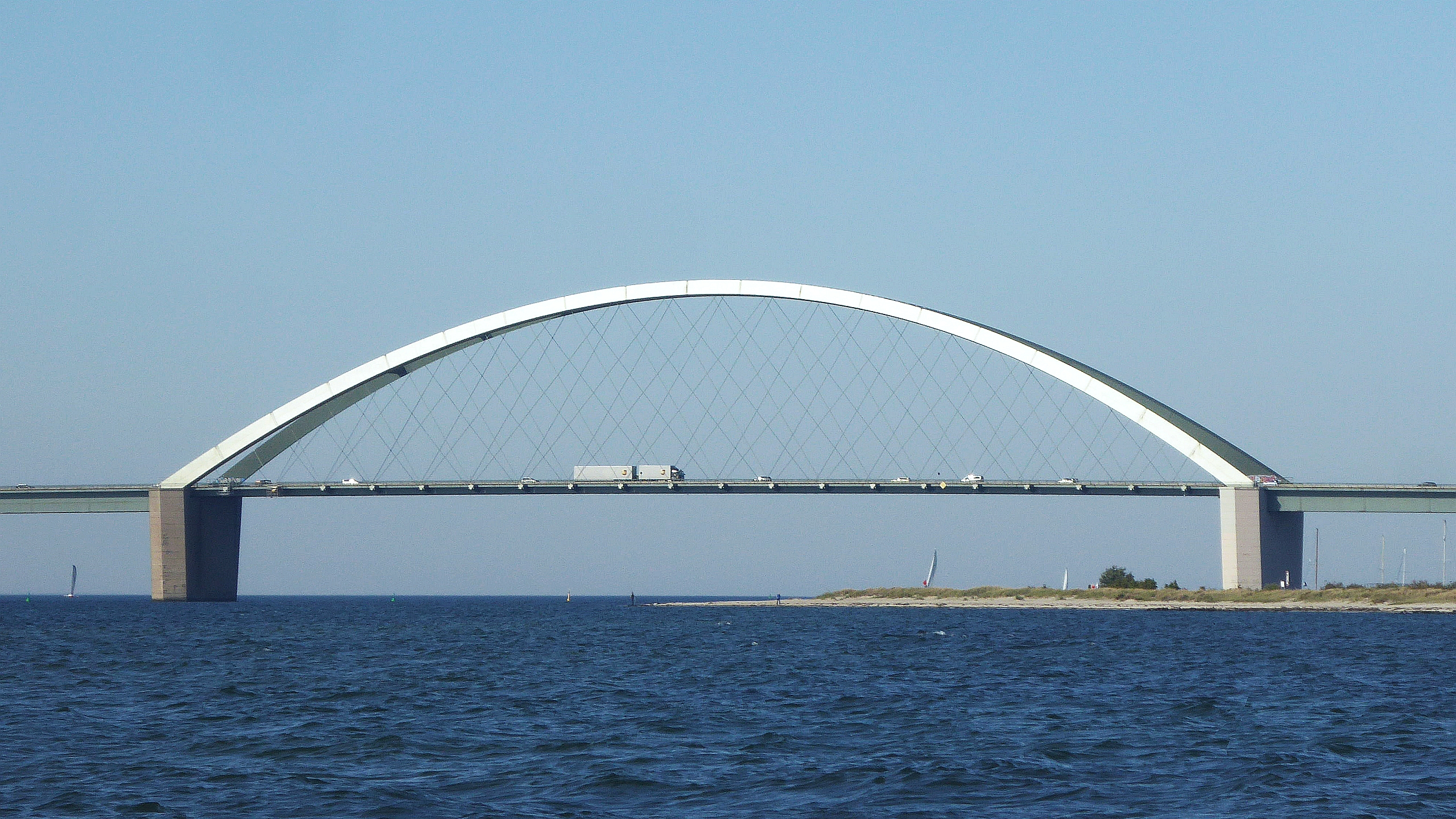
Fehmarn Sound bridge seen from east

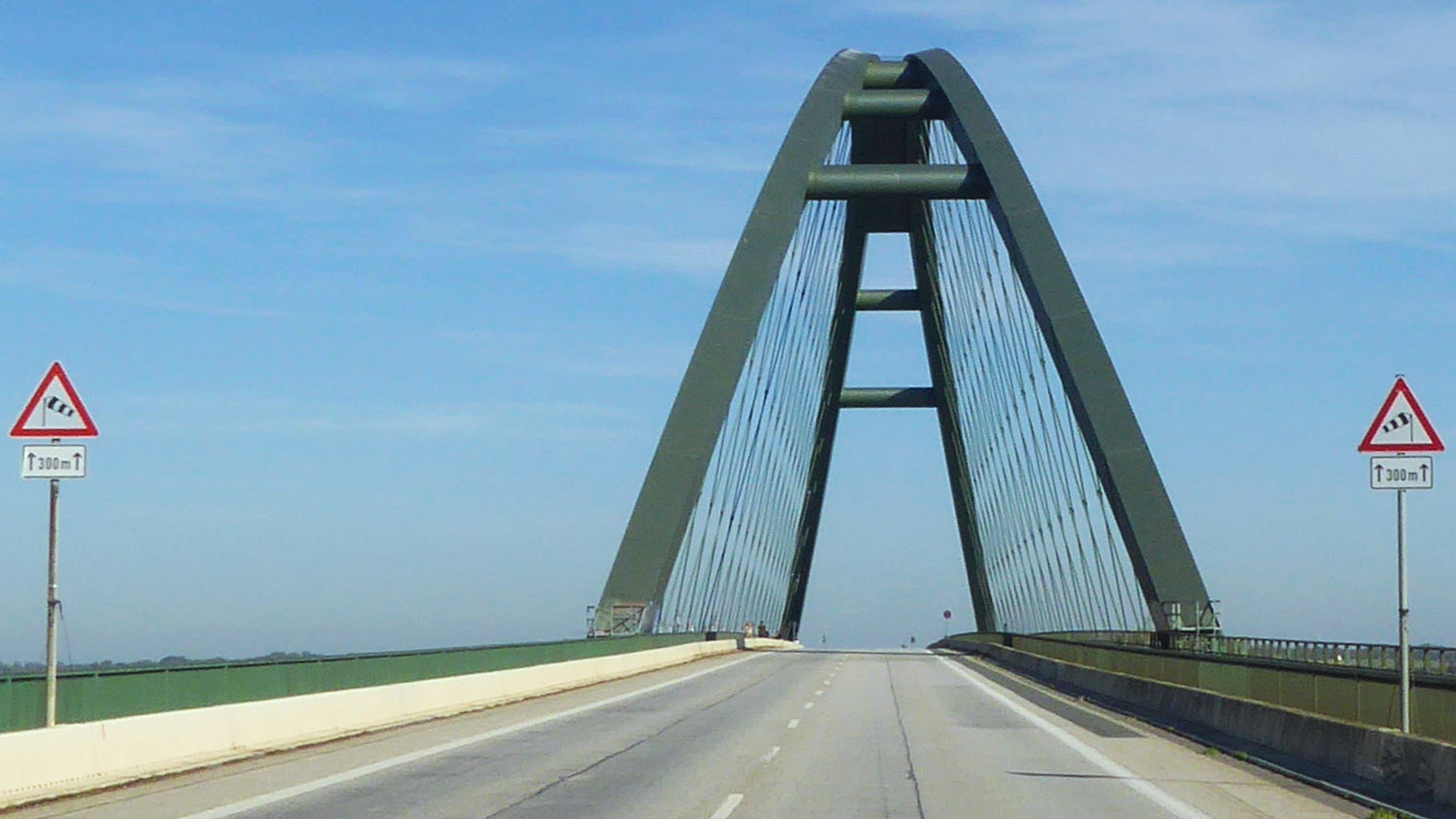
Fehmarn sound bridge seen from south. In use as a road bridge, rail bridge and with bike path

== Future ==
A Fehmarn Belt Tunnel is under construction between Denmark and Germany, with four lanes (2+2) and double track railway. But according to the agreement between the two countries, the Fehmarn Sound bridge can remain as it is, one lane per direction and a single railway track.

In December 2012 a study was published saying that the bridge could not cope with the increased railway and road traffic expected after the tunnel opening.

In 2020 it was decided to build a four lane, double track railway Fehmarn Sound Tunnel to carry most of the increased traffic. However, the bridge will still remain in place for pedestrians and local road traffic.

== See also ==
- List of bridges in Germany
