= Vogelfluglinie =

Transport corridor between Denmark and Germany

Coordinates: 54°34′N 11°17′E

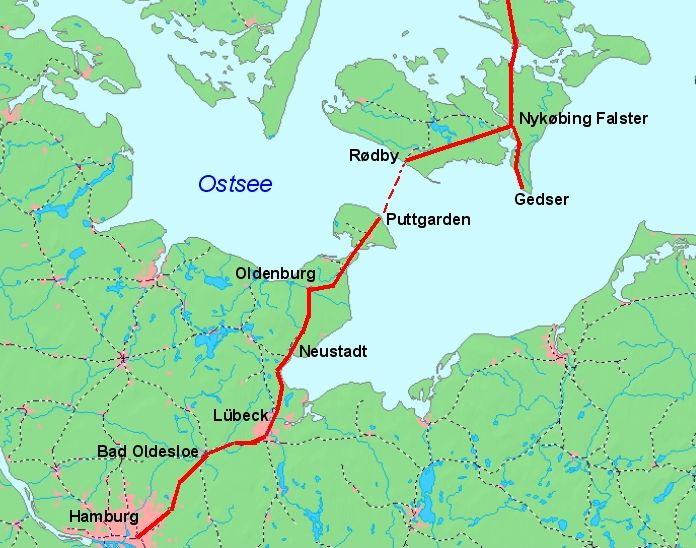
The German and part of the Danish railway line

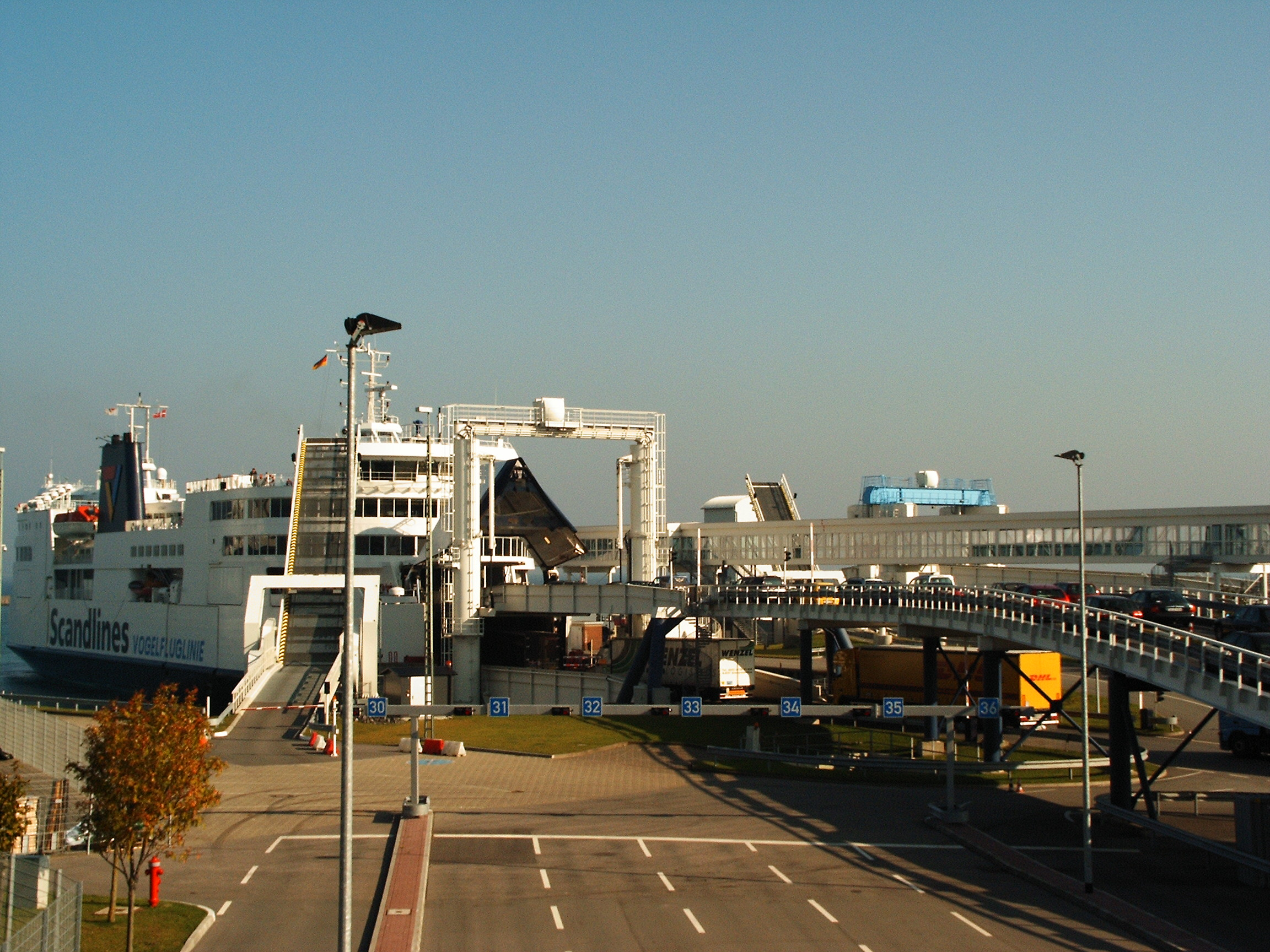
Ferry at Puttgarden. Trains and cars are loaded by the lower ramp, cars only by the upper ramp.

The Vogelfluglinie (German) or Fugleflugtslinjen (Danish) is a transport corridor between Copenhagen, Denmark, and Hamburg, Germany.

As the Danish and German names (literally: bird flight line) imply, the corridor is also an important bird migration route between Arctic Scandinavia and Central Europe.

== History ==
Proposals for a more direct "bird flight line" date back from the 1920s. Construction was started on the Danish side in 1941 after the Nazi occupation force pushed the matter, but work was halted again in 1946. After World War II, Warnemünde (near Rostock) was included in the territory of East Germany. Political divisions made traffic between Denmark and West Germany via Warnemünde inconvenient.

From 1951 to 1963 a ferry line from Gedser to Großenbrode operated as a temporary solution. In addition, traffic between Copenhagen and Hamburg would either be directed over the Great Belt ferry, Funen and Jutland or the Gedser-Warnemünde ferry. Construction of the "bird flight line" was restarted in 1949 and completed in 1963.

On 14 December 2019 at 20:02 the last train from DSB and Deutsche Bahn arrived in Rødbyhavn. Trains between Hamburg and Copenhagen run via Funen and Jutland until the Fehmarnbelt connection is completed. The rail ferry was discontinued because service would have been degraded massively while works on Sydbanen were ongoing.

== Ferry link ==
The core of the connection is the 19-kilometre (12 mi) ferry link between Rødby (Denmark) and Puttgarden (Germany). The line is operated by Scandlines. Ferries take 45 minutes and operate twice an hour, 24 hours a day.

The projected Fehmarn Belt Fixed Link, an undersea tunnel, will replace the ferries. Danish-German negotiations on 29 June 2007 culminated in an agreement to complete the link by 2028, essentially on the basis of Danish funding.

== Landside connections ==
=== Road ===
The road connection consists of:

- European route E47 on the Danish side.
- Autobahn A1 (European routes E 47 and E22) on the German side, and the two-lane Bundesstraße 207/E 47 on the northernmost section. An additional 10 km (6.2 mi) of motorway was completed by 2008, still leaving the last 25 km (16 mi) a two-lane road.

=== Railway ===
The rail connection consists of:

- 118 km (73 mi) of double track from Copenhagen to Vordingborg; maximum speed 160 to 180 km/h (99 to 112 mph); electrified for 64 km (40 mi) to Ringsted
- 65 km (40 mi) of single track from Vordingborg to Rødby; maximum speed 120 km/h (75 mph)
- 89 km (55 mi) of single track from Puttgarden to Lübeck
- 64 km (40 mi) of double track from Lübeck to Hamburg, electrified.

Until 2019, three to five EuroCity trains a day in each direction used train ferries to provide passenger services between Copenhagen and Hamburg, operated with DBAG Class 605 trains by Deutsche Bahn (out of service since 2017) and Danish IC3 trains. With the completion of the Great Belt Bridge freight trains are no longer directed via Rødby-Puttgarden, but via Funen and Jutland. Since the end of 2019, passenger trains have also used this route, which is 160 km (99 mi) longer but around 20 minutes faster and allows longer trains. Only some of the IC3 trains were capable of going to Germany.

These current bridges and tunnels are part of the connection:

- Masnedsund Bridge and Storstrøm Bridge, Sealand/Falster (rail)
- Farø Bridges, Sealand/Falster (motorway E47)
- Frederick IX Bridge, Falster/Lolland (two-lane road and rail)
- Guldborgsund Tunnel, Falster/Lolland (motorway E47)
- Rødbyhavn (harbour, Denmark)
- Puttgarden (harbour, Germany)
- Fehmarn Sound bridge, Fehmarn/Germany (two-lane road E47 and rail)

== High-speed railway under construction ==
'Railway axis Fehmarn Belt' as part of Denmark's high-speed rail network

The 'Railway axis Fehmarn Belt' is the Priority Project 20 of the Trans-European Transport Network (TEN-T) that seeks to establish a high-speed rail line Copenhagen–Hamburg, and which central section is the Fehmarn Belt Tunnel's railway. In the north, it connects to the Øresund Bridge/Drogden Tunnel (Priority Project 11) and the Nordic Triangle railway/road axis (Priority Project 12), and in the south to Bremen and Hanover. The full line currently under construction consists of several new railways to be built and old railways to be upgraded, to achieve at least a maximum speed of 200 km/h on all sections:

- Copenhagen–Ringsted Line, opened on 31 May 2019, currently operating at 180 km/h, upgrading to 250 km/h in 2023.
- Sydbanen (Ringsted–Rødbyhavn), new tracks to be laid by 2021, to be electrified to reach 200 km/h by 2024.
- Fehmarn Belt Tunnel (Rødbyhavn–Puttgarden), 200 km/h, to be completed in 2028. (since revised)
- Puttgarden–Lübeck railway, to be electrified and upgraded to reach 200 km/h up from the current 100–160 km/h. The new Fehmarn Sound Tunnel (to be completed in 2028) is part of this section.
- Lübeck–Hamburg railway, to be upgraded to reach 200 km/h.

== Beeline in pictures ==
Vogelfluglinie/Fugleflugtslinien

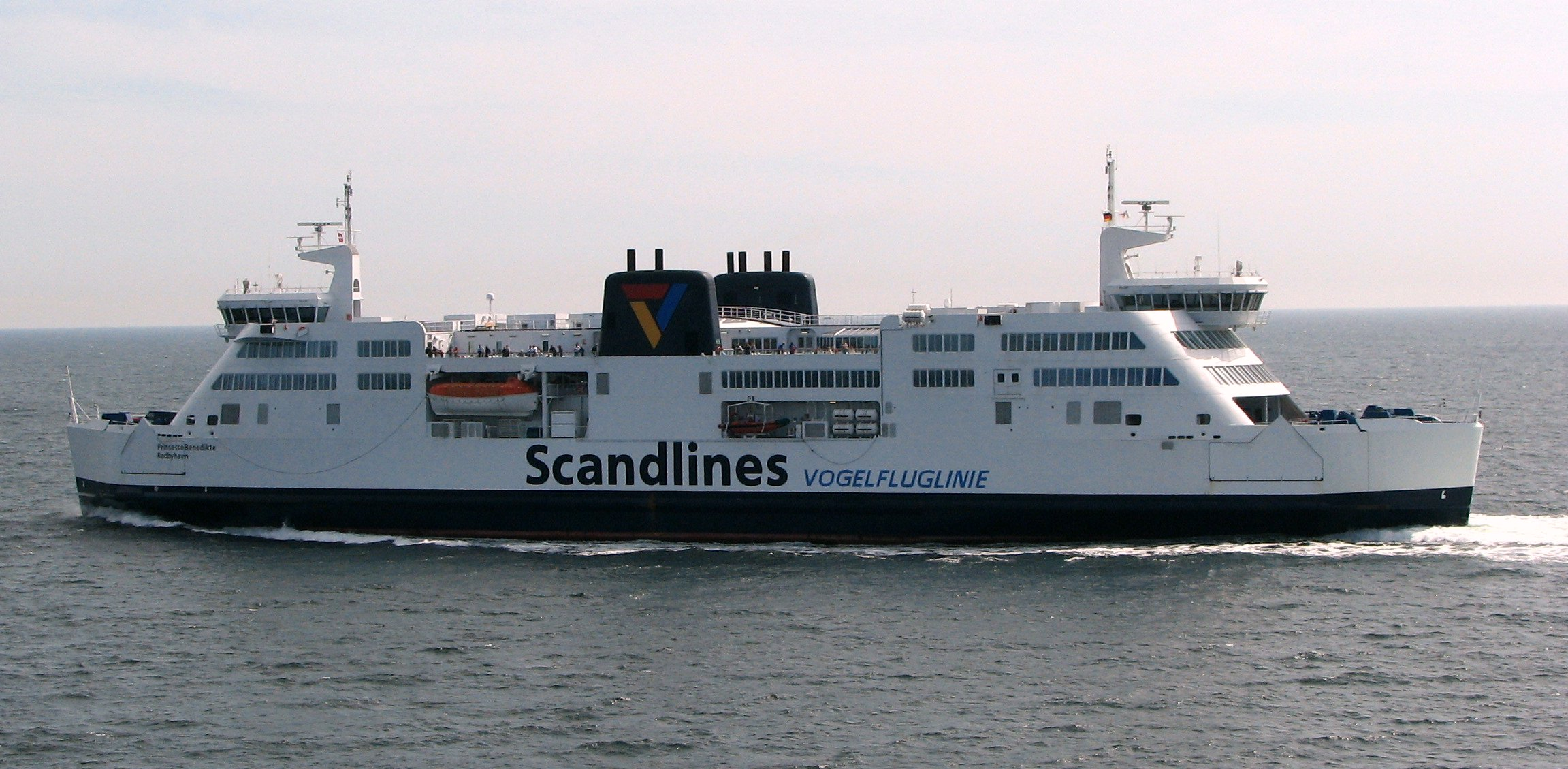
M/S Prinsesse Benedikte, one of the ferries

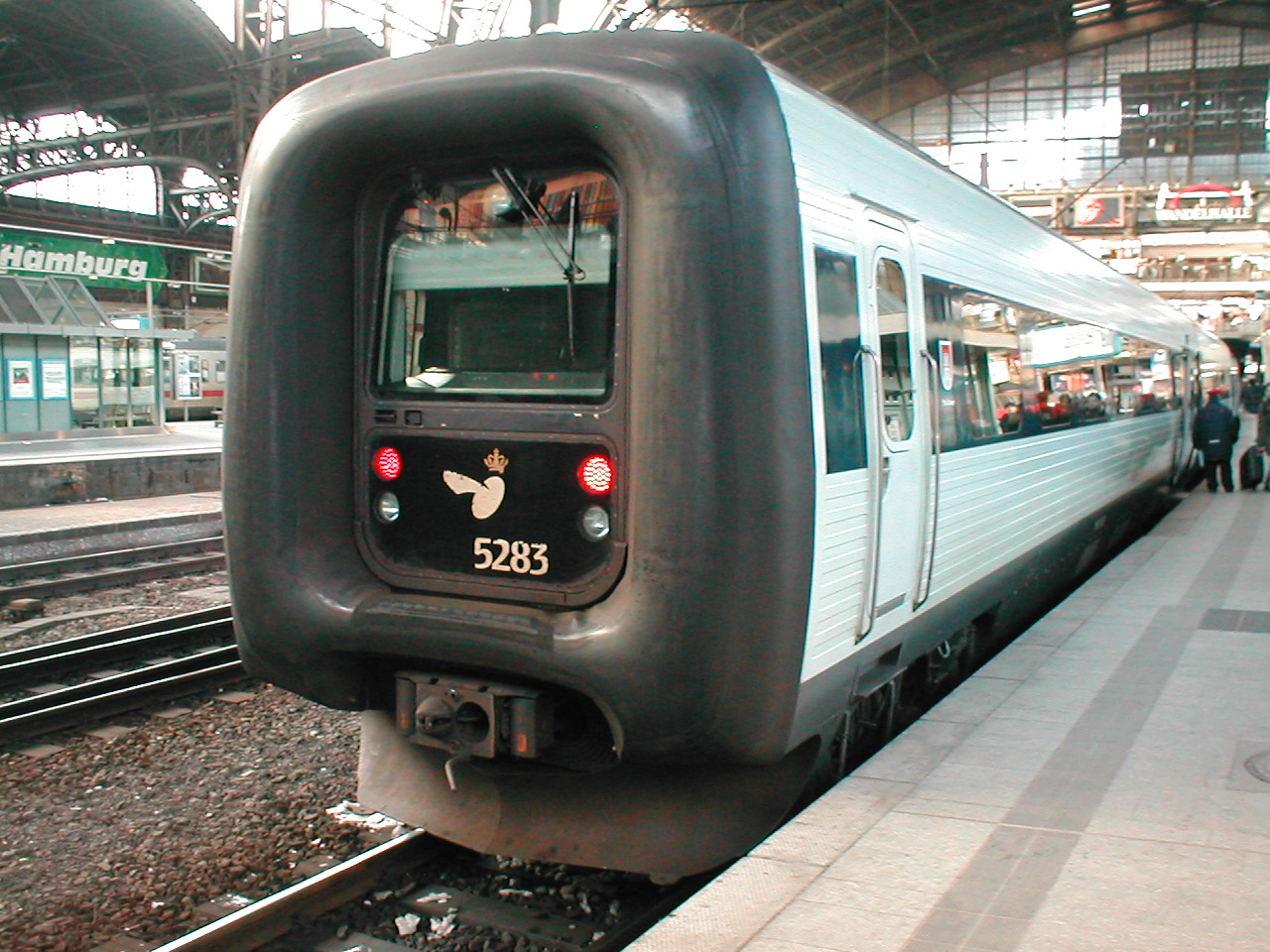
A Danish IC3 train in Hamburg Central Station

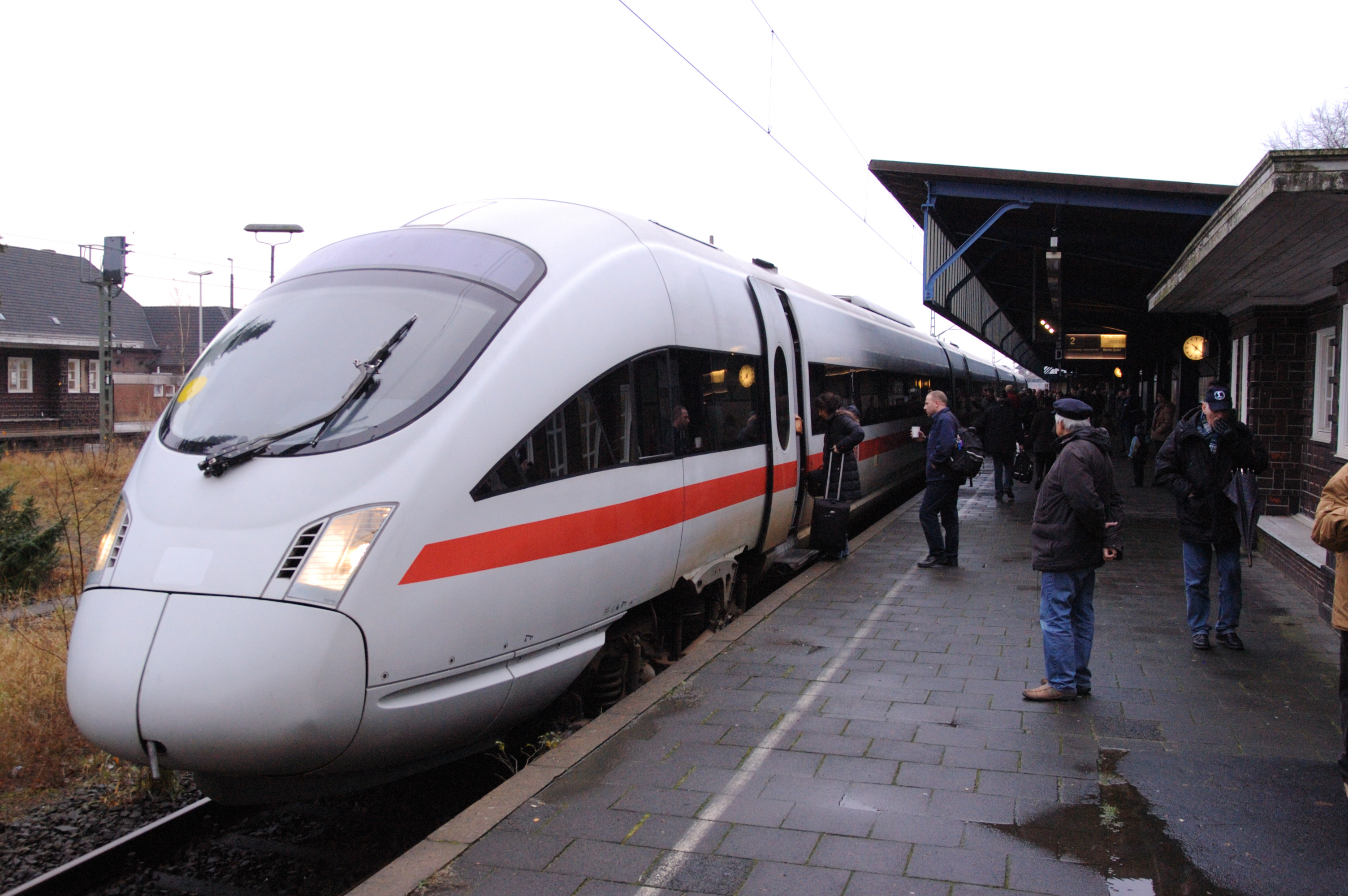
The ICE TD/type 605 formerly used on the Vogelfluglinie

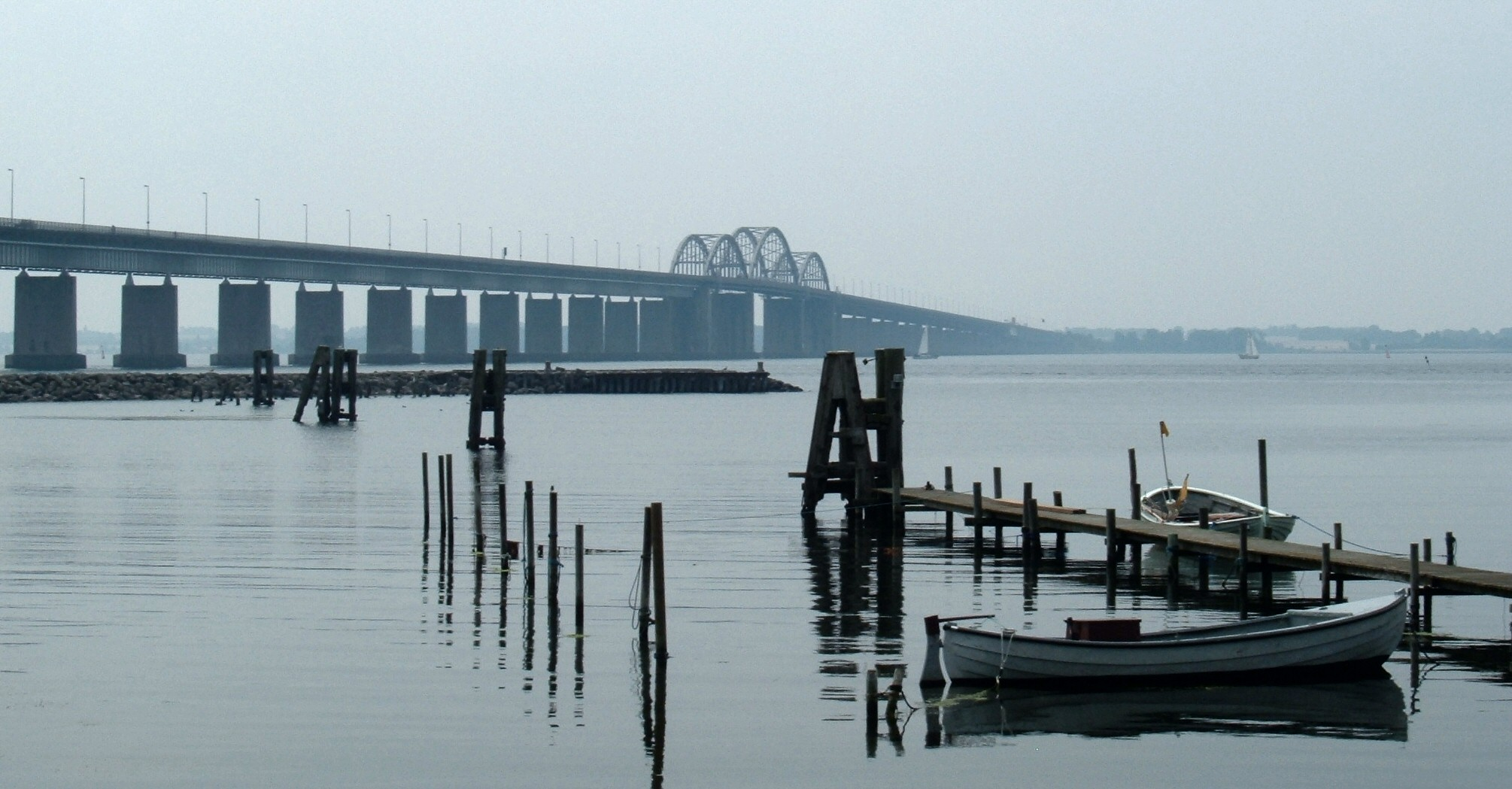
Storstrøm Bridge

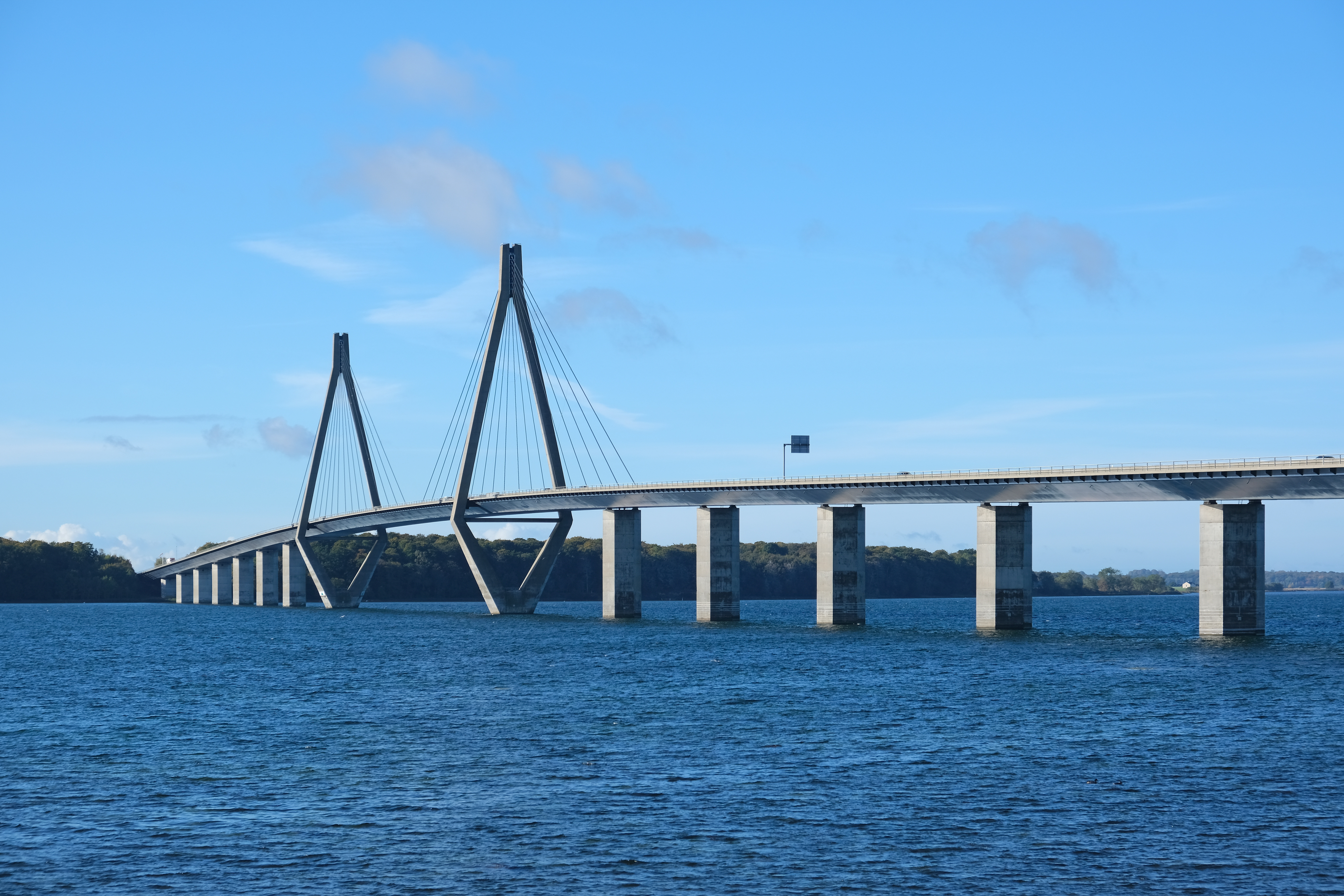
Farø Bridges

Planned route of the Fehmarn Belt Fixed Link

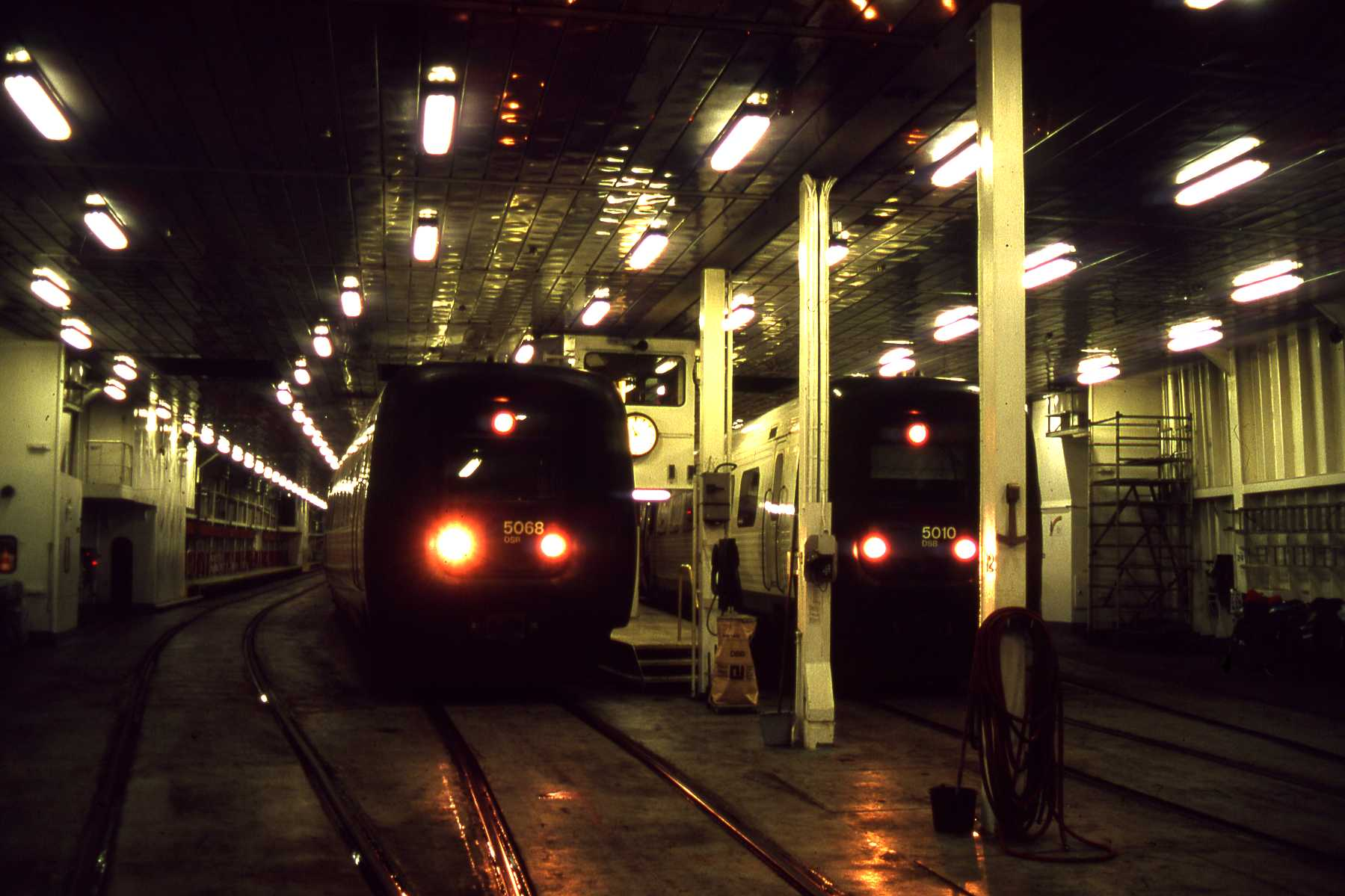
IC3 trains on the boat

== See also ==
- Scandlines
- Fehmarn Belt Fixed Link
- Gedser-Rostock bridge
