= Fehmarnbelt tunnel =

Under-construction immersed tunnel connecting Denmark and Germany

- Map showing the planned Fehmarn Belt fixed link in the Danish–German motorway system

Overview
- Official name: Femern Bælt-tunnelen (Danish); Fehmarnbelt-Tunnel (German)
- Coordinates: 54°34′33″N 11°18′20″E
- Status: Under construction
- Crosses: Fehmarn Belt

Operation
- Work began: 1 January 2021
- Opens: 2031
- Owner: Femern A/S
- Traffic: Rail and road
- Toll: Yes

Technical
- Length: 17.6 km (10.9 mi)
- No. of tracks: 2
- No. of lanes: 4
- Electrified: Yes
- Operating speed: 200 km/h (125 mph)

The Fehmarnbelt tunnel (Note: Danish: Femernbælt-tunnelen; German: Fehmarnbelt-Tunnel), known during planning stages as the Fehmarnbelt fixed link (Note: Danish: Femern Bælt-forbindelsen; German: Fehmarnbelt-Querung), is an under-construction immersed tunnel connecting Denmark and Germany across the 18-kilometre-wide (11 mi) Fehmarn Belt strait in the Baltic Sea.

The tunnel will link the Danish island of Lolland with the German island of Fehmarn, forming part of a transport corridor between Scandinavia and mainland Europe. It will replace the ferry service on the "Bird flight line", (Note: Danish: Fugleflugtslinjen; German: Vogelfluglinie) operated by Scandlines, and is expected to reduce crossing times between Lolland and Fehmarn from 45 minutes by ferry, to about 10 minutes by car and seven minutes by train.

The tunnel is planned to become the world's longest combined road and rail tunnel. It will include an electrified railway capable of reaching speeds of up to 200 km/h (125 mph).

Designed and financed by Danish state-owned Femern A/S, the tunnel was approved in 2015 with a construction budget of 52.6 billion krone (equivalent to US$8.2 billion), making it the largest transport infrastructure investment in Denmark's history. The cost is expected to be partly recouped through tolls. Germany plans to contribute a further €800 million towards connecting the tunnel to its motorway network. The tunnel is expected to be completed in 2031.

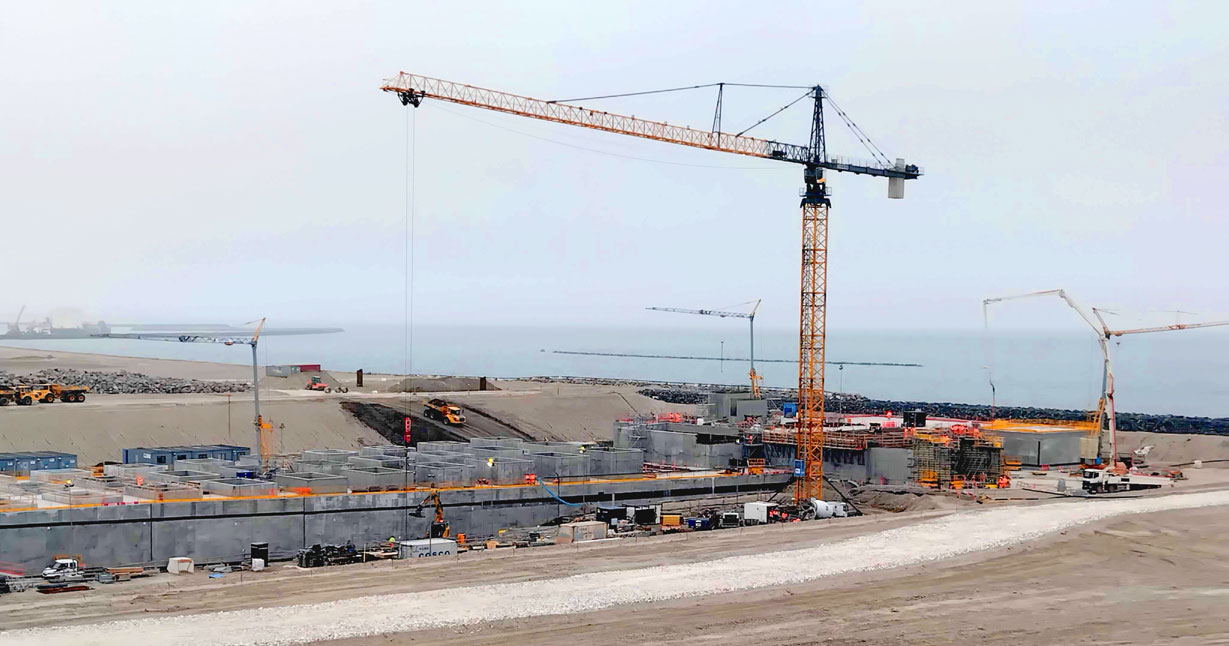
The under-construction entrance to the tunnel

== History ==
=== Bridge proposal ===
Since 1963, the German island of Fehmarn has been connected to the mainland through the Fehmarn Sound Bridge. Since then, connection to the Danish island of Lolland has been provided by a regular ferry service across the strait. This started the discussion about a fixed link across the strait. By the late 1990s, feasibility studies had been carried out for constructing a bridge. Ideas involved a bridge carrying both a four-lane motorway and two electrified rail tracks. This solution was for years regarded as the most likely scheme and detailed plans were drawn up. The Fehmarn Belt bridge was originally expected to be completed by 2018.

However, in late 2010, after further feasibility studies, the Danish project planners declared that an immersed tunnel would instead present fewer construction risks and would cost about the same. The project's cost had grown to €7.4 billion after initially being estimated at €5.5 billion in 2007.

The bridge would have been about 20 kilometres (12 mi) long, comprising three cable-stayed spans. The four pillars in the substructure of the bridge would probably have been about 280 metres (920 ft) tall, with vertical clearance about 65 metres (213 ft) above sea level, allowing ocean-going ships to pass beneath it. The design of the bridge links was being carried out by the Dissing+Weitling company for its aesthetical features and by the COWI and Obermeyer companies for their civil engineering aspects. The proposed design would have carried four motorway lanes and two railway tracks.

=== Tunnel solution ===
Although originally conceived as a bridge, Femern A/S (the Danish state-owned company tasked with designing and planning the link) announced in December 2010 that a tunnel was preferable, and the tunnel idea received support from a large majority of the Danish Parliament in January 2011. The completion date was revised in 2012 to 2021, in 2014 to 2024, in 2015 to 2028, in 2020 to 2029, and in 2026 to 2032.

In February 2015, the draft bill for the construction was introduced to the Danish parliament, and the Danish Government submitted an application for DKK 13 billion (€1.7 billion) in EU grants, supported by Germany and Sweden. In June 2015, €589 million of EU funding was awarded to Denmark by the European Commission under its Connecting Europe Facility (CEF) scheme, allowing the tunnel project to go ahead. In March 2017, the operating company announced the sign-up of subcontractors for the project.

On 13 December 2018, the Court of Justice of the European Union ruled in favour of Scandlines in Case T‑630/15 regarding state aid.

The European Commission claimed on 28 September 2018 that there has been no unlawful aid. Action regarding that has been brought before court in January 2019 in Case T-7/19.

== Project ==
The project is comparable in size to other Danish bridges at Øresund Bridge and the Great Belt Bridge. According to a report released on 30 November 2010 by Femern A/S (a subsidiary of the Danish state-owned Sund & Bælt Holding A/S), the company tasked with designing and planning the link between Denmark and Germany, the corridor for the alignment of the link has now been determined and will be sited in a corridor running east of the ferry ports of Puttgarden and Rødbyhavn.

The Fehmarn Belt Fixed Link and its double tracks will shorten the rail journey from Hamburg to Copenhagen from four hours and 40 minutes to two hours and 30 minutes. According to current plans there will be one passenger train and two freight trains in each direction per hour. The highway between Copenhagen and Hamburg is already a motorway except for 25 kilometres (16 mi) in Germany that is a two-lane expressway. The narrow Fehmarn Sound Bridge will be replaced by a new Fehmarn Sound Tunnel with a four-lane motorway and double-track railway.

== Design ==
The tunnel consists of 79 standard elements with a length of 217 metres (712 ft) in a design similar to the Drogden trench, with two road tubes, one emergency tube and two rail tubes. Additionally, there are ten service elements with a length of 85.7 metres (281 ft) but both wider and higher with a subfloor (basement) to house technical equipment.

=== Financing ===
When the Danish Folketing (parliament) ratified the project in March 2009, its cost was estimated at 42 billion DKK (€5 billion). This cost included €1.5 billion for other improvements such as electrifying and improving 160 kilometres (99 mi) of railway from single-track to double-track on the Danish side. In 2011 this was increased to a total of €5.5 billion (at 2008 prices). On top of this there will be cost of at least €1 billion for the German rail connection, which will be paid by the German government.

The Fehmarn Belt Fixed Link will be financed by state-guaranteed loans, which will be paid by the road and train tolls. Denmark will be solely responsible for guaranteeing the funding of the project at an estimated cost of 35 billion kroner or (€4.7 billion) and German participation will be limited to the development of the land-based facilities on the German side. The government of Denmark will own the fixed link outright, will be allowed to keep tolls after the loans have been repaid, and will enjoy any employment opportunities at the toll station. The fees are also planned to pay for the Danish railway upgrading.

On the German side, the road will be widened to four lanes and the railway to double track and, according to the treaty, paid by the German government without a toll for users.

The European Union has designated this project as one of the 30 prioritised transport infrastructure projects (TEN-T). It has committed to a €600 million to €1.2 billion subsidy. The project is expected to have a five percent rate of return for Europe. Construction estimates covered the period from 1 April 1998 until 2021.

== Land connections ==
=== New Storstrømmen and Fehmarn Sound links ===
Two new links are planned. One about 1 kilometre (0.6 mi) long at the Fehmarn Sound and one slightly more than 3 kilometres (2 mi) long at Storstrømmen. According to the 2008 Danish–German treaty, the bridges did not have to be replaced, and the double-track railway construction in Germany may be delayed by up to seven years. Because of its bad condition, a replacement of the Storstrøm Bridge has been contracted and is slated for completion in 2026. The Schleswig-Holstein State Government announced in 2013 it envisioned the construction of a new Fehmarn Sound link or an upgrade of the current Fehmarn Sound Bridge, since it considered the current bridge – with two lanes for road traffic and one track for rail traffic – to be a bottleneck for the German hinterland connection. On 3 March 2020, the German Federal Ministry of Transport, the State of Schleswig-Holstein and Deutsche Bahn announced that a new 1.7 km long immersed Fehmarn Sound Tunnel (German: Fehmarnsundtunnel) with four road lanes and two rail tracks, costing approximately 714 million euros, is planned to be built by 2028, while the current bridge will be preserved for pedestrians, cyclists and slow road traffic.

=== Railway axis Fehmarn Belt ===
'Railway axis Fehmarn Belt' as part of Denmark's high-speed rail network

The Fehmarn Belt Tunnel's railway is the central section of the 'Railway axis Fehmarn Belt', which is Priority Project 20 of the Trans-European Transport Network (TEN-T) that seeks to establish a high-speed rail line Copenhagen–Hamburg. In the north, it connects to the Øresund Bridge/Drogden Tunnel (Priority Project 11) and the Nordic Triangle railway/road axis (Priority Project 12), and in the south to Bremen and Hanover. The full line currently under construction consists of several new railways to be built and old railways to be upgraded, to achieve at least a maximum speed of 200 km/h (125 mph) on all sections:

- Copenhagen–Ringsted Line, opened on 31 May 2019, since 2023 operating at 200 km/h (125 mph).
- Sydbanen (Ringsted–Rødbyhavn), new tracks to be laid by 2021, to be electrified to reach 200 km/h (125 mph) by 2024.
- Fehmarn Belt Tunnel (Rødbyhavn–Puttgarden), 200 km/h (125 mph), to be completed in 2028. (since revised)
- Puttgarden–Lübeck railway, to be electrified and upgraded to reach 200 km/h (125 mph) up from the current 100–160 km/h (60–100 mph). The new Fehmarn Sound Tunnel (to be completed in 2028) is part of this section.
- Lübeck–Hamburg railway, to be upgraded to reach 200 km/h (125 mph).

== Tunnel characteristics ==
Underwater tunnels are either bored or immersed: tunnel boring is common for deepwater tunnels longer than 4 or 5 kilometres (3.1 mi), and immersion is commonly used for tunnels that cross relatively shallow waters. Immersion involves dredging a trench across the seafloor, laying a foundation bed of sand or gravel, and then lowering precast concrete tunnel sections into the excavation and covering it with a protective layer of backfill several metres thick.

An immersed tunnel is planned for the Fehmarn Belt. At 17.6 km (10.9 mi), it will be the longest ever constructed, surpassing the current largest immersed tube tunnel, which spans 6.75 km (4.19 mi) across the Pearl River Estuary in China as part of the Hong Kong–Zhuhai–Macau Bridge. On 30 November 2010, Denmark's Femern A/S project manager announced it had selected immersed tunnel design submitted by the Ramboll, Arup, and TEC consortium. According to the senior project managers, as well as being the world's longest immersed tunnel, it will be the "world's longest combined road and rail tunnel; the world's longest under water tunnel for road; the deepest immersed tunnel with road and rail traffic; and the second deepest concrete immersed tunnel." The size of the project is about five times the tunnel part of the Øresund Link between Denmark and Sweden, currently the "longest immersed concrete tunnel."

The deepest section of the Fehmarn Belt Trench is 35 metres (115 ft) and the tunnel sections will be about 10 metres (33 ft) high, thus, the dredging barges will need to be capable of reaching depths of over 45 metres (148 ft). Dredging will produce a trench some 40–50 metres (130–160 ft) wide and 12–15 metres (39–49 ft) deep. These parameters give a total of some 20,000,000 cubic metres (710,000,000 cu ft) of soil to be dredged. Conventional dredging equipment can reach only a depth of about 25 metres (82 ft). To excavate the middle portion of the Fehmarn trench, deeper than 25 metres (82 ft) below the water's surface, will likely require grab dredgers and trailing suction hopper dredgers.

The proposed tunnel would be 17.6 kilometres (10.9 mi) long, 40 metres (130 ft) deep below the surface of the sea and would carry a double-track railway. Arguments brought forward in favour of a tunnel include its starkly reduced environmental impact, its independence from weather conditions, as crosswinds can have considerable impact on trucks and trailers, especially on a north–south bridge. A bored tunnel was deemed too expensive.

The precast concrete tunnel sections will have a rectangular cross-section that is about 40 metres (130 ft) wide and 10 metres (33 ft) high, containing four separate passageways (two for cars and two for trains), plus a small service passageway: There will be separate northbound and southbound tubes for vehicles, each 11 metres (36 ft) wide, each with two travel lanes and a breakdown lane; while the northbound and southbound passageways for trains will be 6 metres (20 ft) wide each and about 10 metres (33 ft) high; the service passageway will be 3 metres (9.8 ft) wide; the standoff space between each "tube" will vary, but the overall width will be 41.2 metres (135 ft). The single-level, sectional arrangement of the two road and rail tubes side-by-side – with the road west and the railway east – coincide with the arrangement of the existing road and rail infrastructure, and requires no weaving to connect.

== Timeline ==
=== 2007 ===
An interim agreement was reached in Berlin between the Danish and German authorities on 29 June (represented by their transport ministers) to proceed with the construction of the fixed link. Details provided by Danmarks Radio stated that the Fehmarn Belt Fixed Link would run 19 km (12 mi) from a point about 2 km (1 mi) east of Rødby in Denmark to Puttgarden on the Island of Fehmarn, which was already connected by bridge to the German mainland. Construction would start in 2015 and was expected to be completed by the end of 2021.

=== 2008 ===
On 3 September, the ministers of transportation from Denmark and Germany, Carina Christensen and Wolfgang Tiefensee, signed the treaty for the construction of the Fehmarn Belt Fixed Link at a ceremony held in Copenhagen.

=== 2009 ===
On 26 March, the construction was ratified by the Danish Parliament, and approved by the German Parliament on 18 June.

=== 2010 ===
It was announced in December that a tunnel would be used rather than a bridge to present fewer construction risks than a cable-stayed bridge, which would be pushing the limits of the technology. The cost and the construction time would be roughly the same.

=== 2011 ===
In January, a large majority of the parties in the Danish Parliament voted to support a tunnel solution. However, national approval procedures in both countries needed to be completed. In Germany, that involved the application for a plan approval process. In Denmark, the project would require the passage in Parliament of a Construction Act.

On 16 December, the German government announced that it was postponing development of the railway link to the Fehmarn Tunnel until after 2015. According to a report in Der Nordschleswiger, German Traffic Minister Peter Ramsauer decided to reduce planned government investment in new infrastructure in Germany by 25 per cent because of the economic crisis. It was not immediately clear what effect the postponement would have on the overall Fehmarn Belt Fixed Link project.

=== 2013 ===
In October 2013, the tunnel company applied to German authorities for approval according to environmental law and other laws of Germany and EU. This was rejected in 2015 because new legislation that appeared in the meantime was not accounted for.

=== 2015 ===
On 25 February, the bill for the Construction Act for the Fehmarn belt link was introduced in the Danish Parliament. On 26 February, the Danish Ministry of Transport submitted an application for an EU grant of DKK 13 billion (€1.7 billion) for the project's construction phase. The application was accompanied by letters of support from the Swedish Minister for Infrastructure, Anna Johansson, and the German Transport Minister, Alexander Dobrindt. In addition, the German State Government of Schleswig-Holstein, as well as a wide range of business organisations from the Danish, Swedish, and German sides, sent statements supporting the application. EU finally approved DKK 6.92 billion in total for the tunnel and the connecting Danish railway, around 15% of the cost.

=== 2016 ===
On 13 June, the tunnel company applied again to German authorities for approval, based on an updated application of 11,000 pages adopted to new legal principles that appeared since last application. It was expected that this process would be complete in 2018. It expected that two further years would be spent in court processes, since political objectors had stated they would appeal the authority approval.

=== 2018 ===
On 28 December, the German authority decided to approve the project.

=== 2019 ===
On 6 February, Femern A/S received German plan approval for the tunnel. This had been appealed to the Federal Administrative Court by political objectors. DB Netz AG submitted a document to the BMVI detailing variants of the rail connection to the tunnel later that same month. The railway plans would need approval by the German Parliament. In March, Femern A/S decided on a Government request to start large preparatory work on land, such as building a factory for concrete tunnel elements, in anticipation of a positive German court decision later.

=== 2020 ===
On 3 March, the German Federal Ministry of Transport, the State of Schleswig-Holstein and Deutsche Bahn announced that a new 1.7 km long immersed Fehmarn Sound Tunnel (German: Fehmarnsundtunnel) with four road lanes and two rail tracks, costing approximately €714 million, is scheduled to be built by 2028, and the current Fehmarn Sound Bridge, which was at risk of becoming a bottleneck, would be preserved for pedestrians, cyclists and slow road traffic.

On 30 April, it was announced by Femern A/S that work was scheduled to begin on 1 January 2021 although it was possible that this would be delayed because of the effects of the COVID-19 pandemic. Femern had already begun a number of pre-construction activities at Puttgarden.

On 3 November, the Federal Administrative Court ruled that the project could be built, but some reefs would have to be considered. The Naturschutzbund Deutschland described it as a "dark day for the marine environment". Sabine Leidig (Die Linke) commented: "The ecological effects and the burden upon the neighbours of this giant project are much too large, compared to its small utility."

=== 2021 ===
On 1 January, work began on the actual tunnel construction, with an official online ceremony.

=== 2022 ===
On 18 January, the German Federal Administrative Court in Leipzig imposed a construction freeze on the areas near protected reefs, while it considered legal challenges from a group opposed to the project. On 12 May, work began on the tunnel's northern entrance (Danish side). and on 24 May, the dredging work of the tunnel was 50% completed, i.e., 11 km had been dredged. Due to inflation and interest rates, it was reported that in the first nine months of 2022 construction costs had risen to about 15.5 million krone per day. On 14 December, all complaints from political organisations were dismissed by the Federal Administrative Court in Leipzig.

=== 2023 ===
On 6 January, the dredging work for the tunnel was 70% completed. In July, the German work harbor became operational and in August the tunnel element factory was completed. In December, the first tunnel element was finished and it was expected to be immersed in the Fehmarnbelt in 2024.

=== 2024 ===
On 15 April, construction work on the railway link from Puttgarden to Lübeck started on Fehmarn. Some of the sections of the German railway project, mainly south of Altenkrempe, were then still being planned again as they had been dismissed by authorities.

=== 2025 ===
A viewing platform with a height of 24 m opened in Rødbyhavn at the beginning of 2025. The tunnel portals at Rødbyhavn and Puttgarden were completed in late 2025, establishing the transition points between the land-based motorway/railway and the underwater tunnel and leaving the infrastructure ready for the immersion of the first tunnel elements underwater. The 160-metre-long Danish portal structure was backfilled to integrate with the surrounding landscape, while work continued on the 800-metre-long rail ramps.

However, challenges appeared in 2024 and 2025. The specially designed vessel, which shall install the tunnel elements into the water, and its work methods have not been approved by German environmental authorities. These strengthened requirements compared to when the vessel was designed, including underwater noise and mud spill, and more. It is, as of the end of 2025, a 1½-year delay in approval, and the vessel's approval is uncertain, and environmental authorities can invent new requirements when existing ones have been fulfilled. It is clear at this time that the tunnel will not be finished in 2029.

=== 2026 ===
Following final testing of its 66-winch precision system in early 2026, the two specialized vessel IVY 1 & IVY 2 received official approval from the Danish Maritime Authority to begin offshore operations. Between 4 and 6 May, the project reached a major milestone when the first 217-metre-long concrete element was transported from Rødbyhavn and successfully lowered into the dredged trench. This 73,500-tonne structure was precisely connected to the Danish tunnel portal, marking the commencement of the primary underwater assembly phase for the remaining 88 elements.

=== Tunnel Sections ===
Part	Name	Date of installed	Days since last lowering	Type	Meters in total
1	Rødbyhavn	7 May 2026		Standart element	217 meters
2	Lund	27 June 2026	51 days	Standart element	434 meters
3	Heiligenhafen	1 August 2026	35 days	Standart element	651 meters
4	Nykøbing Falster	28 September 2026	56 days	Standart element	868 meters
5			55 days	Service element	
6					
7					

== Criticism ==
The crossing has been discussed since before the reunification of Germany, when the only possible link was towards Hamburg, as going towards communist East Germany was not a viable option. Although times have changed and Europe has been politically and economically reshaped in the meantime, the plans for the Fehmarn Belt Fixed Link have stayed the course. The Cold War era conceptualization of the Fehmarn Belt Fixed Link has been highly criticized, as some see connecting the two capitals of Copenhagen and Berlin and on a larger scale, a link from Scandinavia to the former Warsaw Pact countries as a priority of the utmost importance. A Gedser–Rostock Bridge, about 50 km (31 mi) further east, has been proposed as an alternative or to complement the Fehmarn Belt Fixed Link, as this alternative proposal would better connect eastern Germany including Berlin and places further east and south with Scandinavia.

Despite an offer to help offset the costs of the tunnel by the Danish Cyclists' Federation, it is not planned to include a cycle path.

There have been objections from local people on the German side, both from those fearing the loss of jobs in connection with the present busy ferry traffic, and from environmental protectionists who believed that wildlife would suffer from the construction of the originally conceived bridge. At the same time, employment connected to construction works would be only short-term, while residents would suffer from the increase in traffic, especially with the planned freight trains, which would move from the present Jutland-Great Belt Fixed Link route. In particular, there are concerns with the potential increase of train noise for some residents with moving the freight train traffic from the current route to this new route. These critics have been the loudest and they have been able to get a realignment of the planned railway route. The present Hamburg freight rail bypass used today for the freight traffic, is disturbing more people than the villages north of Lübeck.

Furthermore, it is claimed that the project might be economically unjustified, as predictions of passenger traffic and goods transport may be overestimated and there is a considerable risk that the investment will not be recouped. The European Court of Auditors has criticised the planning of the German land connection for letting costs rise uncontrolled. This cost is more than double what would be if following the legal requirements for a 160 km/h (100 mph) railway (the originally decided speed). Local lobbyists have been allowed to get things such as realignment and extra noise protection.

In 2019, the Bundesrechnungshof commented that "in view of the current traffic forecasts, it is questionable whether the benefits of the project will increase to such an extent that the expected costs are justified under economic aspects".

== Support ==
There have been complaints from some Swedish politicians over long train travel times between Sweden and Germany, and the lack of night trains. The Fehmarn Belt Fixed Link would improve the travel time and make it possible to travel between Copenhagen and Hamburg in two and a half hours.

In 2020, the Swedish Government decided to financially support international night trains from Stockholm to mainland Europe, one from Stockholm via Copenhagen to Hamburg, which began operations by SJ in September 2022, and another one from Malmö to Brussels, which was not bid for and did not commence. On top of these, there is a commercially operated night train from Stockholm to Berlin via Copenhagen and Hamburg, which is operated by Snälltåget and started June 2021. Before 2021, a night train operated under various operators Malmö-Berlin (originally longer route) from 1909 to 2020 through the Trelleborg–Sassnitz ferry.

== See also ==
- Gateway Program (Northeast Corridor) – new rail tunnels under the Hudson River
