= Femern A/S =

Danish planning company

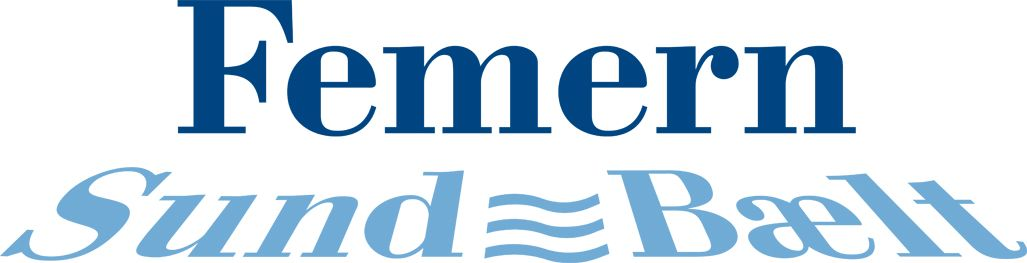
- Company type: State-owned enterprise
- Founded: 2009
- Headquarters: Copenhagen
- Key people: Claus F. Baunkjær (CEO)
- Services: Planning company
- Number of employees: 106 (January 2018)
- Parent: Sund & Bælt
- Website: www.femern.com

Femern A/S is a Danish planning company charged with preparing the Fehmarnbelt Tunnel across the Baltic Sea between the Danish island of Lolland and the German island of Fehmarn. Construction of the 18 km immersed tunnel, which is expected to be completed by 2029, will comprise a dual-track railway and a four-lane motorway. Femern A/S is in charge of planning and providing the basis for regulatory approval of the project on behalf of the Danish government. The framework for this work falls under a treaty between Denmark and Germany which was signed in 2008. The planned tunnel, together with upgrades to the surrounding infrastructure, will reduce travel times between Northern Germany and Scandinavia.

== Company structure ==
Femern A/S is a subsidiary of Sund & Bælt Holding A/S, which is 100 per cent owned by the Danish Ministry of Transport. Sund & Bælt Holding A/S is also the parent company of A/S Storebælt, which operates the Great Belt Fixed Link and A/S Øresund, which owns the Danish half of the joint venture that operates the Øresund Fixed Link. The CEO of Femern A/S is Claus F. Baunkjær.

Femern A/S is headquartered in Copenhagen. The company also has a representative office in Berlin and public information centres in Burg auf Fehmarn in Germany and Rødbyhavn in Denmark. As of 1 June 2014, the company has 101 employees.
