= Rødbyhavn =

- Town
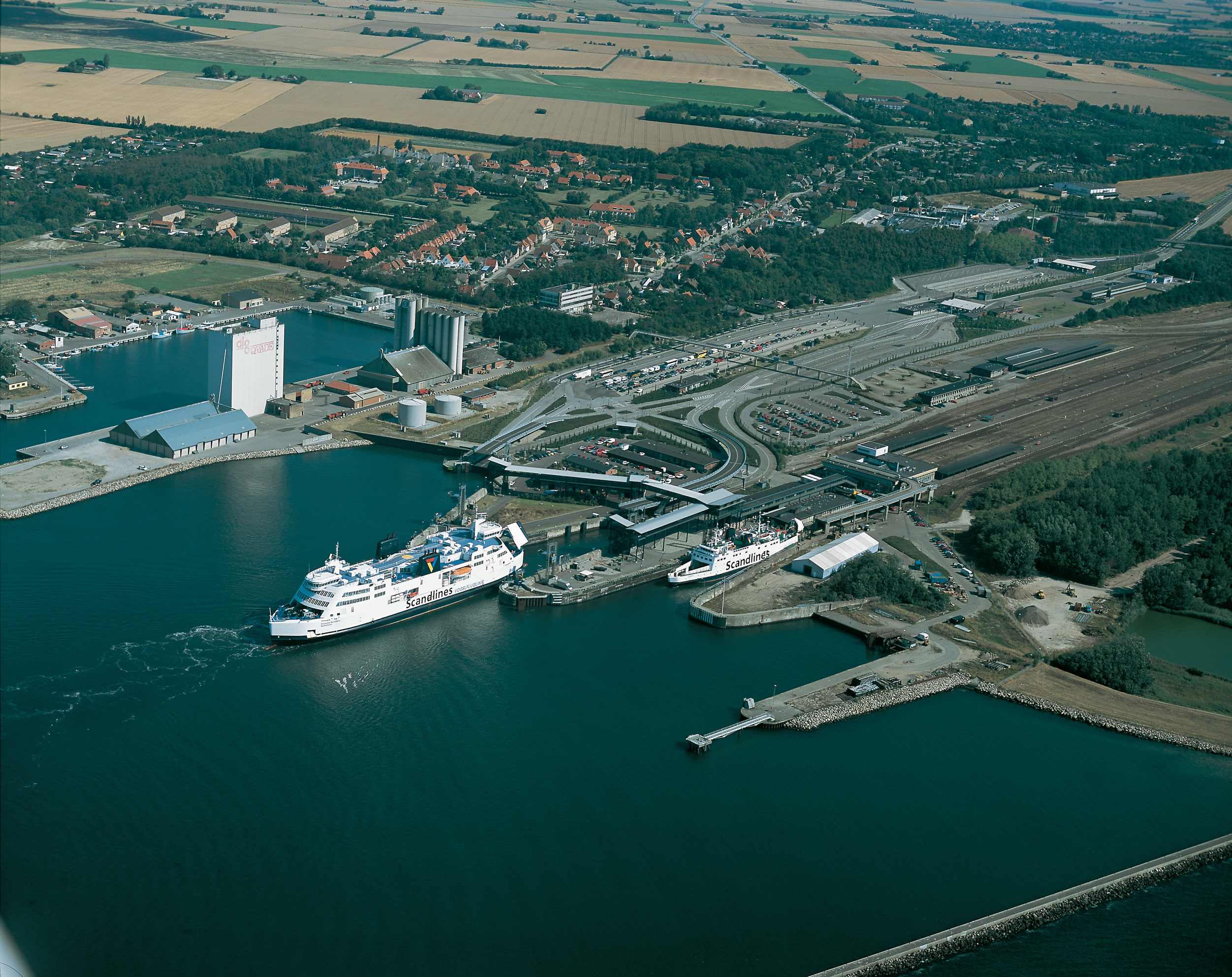
- The ferry harbour in Rødbyhavn

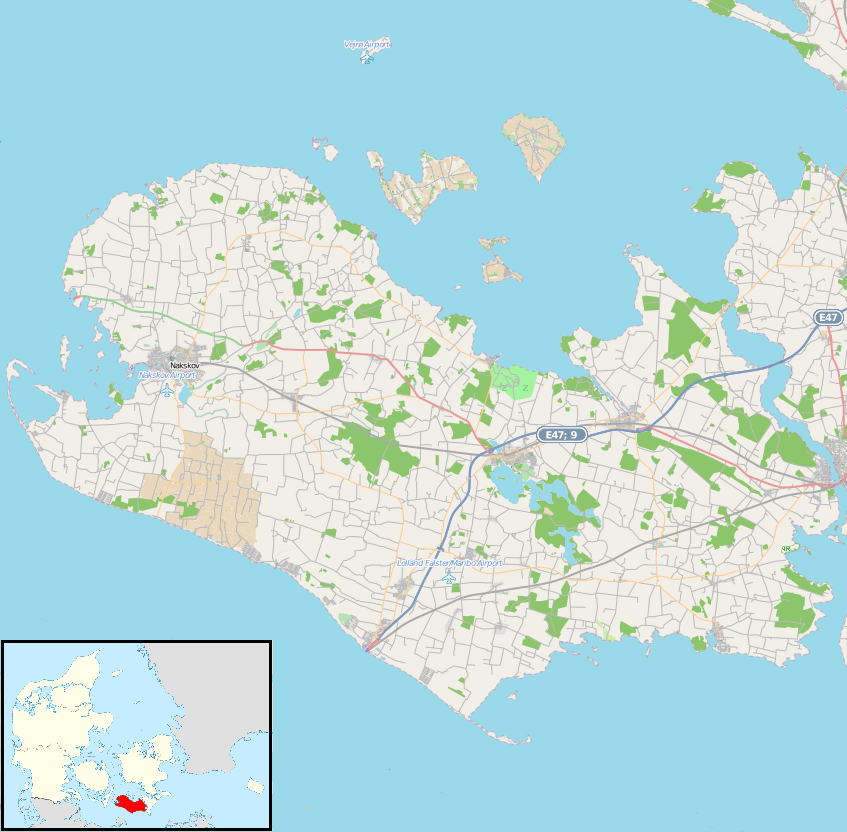
- Location on Lolland Rødbyhavn (Denmark Region Zealand) Rødbyhavn (Denmark)
- Coordinates: 54°39′43″N 11°21′31″E
- Country: Denmark
- Region: Region Zealand
- Municipality: Lolland Municipality

Area
  - Urban: 2.2 km^{2} (0.85 sq mi)

Population (2026)
  - Urban: 1,445
  - Urban density: 660/km^{2} (1,700/sq mi)
- Time zone: UTC+1 (CET)
  - Summer (DST): UTC+2 (CEST)
- Postal code: DK-4970 Rødby

Rødbyhavn (Danish pronunciation: [ʁœðpyˈhɑwˀn]) is a small town and harbour on the south coast of Lolland, Denmark, with a population of 1,445 (1 January 2026). Its name means "Rødby Harbour" and it is located approximately five kilometres (3.1 mi) southwest of the town of Rødby. Since 2007 it has been a part of Lolland Municipality.

Rødbyhavn is a harbour on the northern shore of the Fehmarn Belt. A ferry service connects Rødbyhavn with Puttgarden on the island of Fehmarn. Thus one can drive or take the train from Copenhagen over the Fehmarn Belt, and on to Lübeck and Hamburg by European route E47, which in Germany is known as autobahn A1 or Vogelfluglinie.

The original Lalandia holiday resort is located just west of Rødbyhavn on the shore of Fehmarn Belt.

== History ==
Until work began on constructing a harbour in 1908, this part of the dyke featured only a few small farmsteads. The dyke had been constructed in 1872 following storm floods, and on its outer side, at Syltholm, a harbour for fishing and commerce was opened in 1912. With the emergence of a new settlement to support the activities of the harbour, the name of Syltholm was changed to "Rødbyhavn". 1916 saw the construction of a first shipyard, but by the 1920s, the shipbuilding business at Rødbyhavn ran into bankruptcy, and activity in the harbour stagnated. In 1920, the harbour installations were expanded on the landward side.

In 1941, work began to prepare for the expansion of the harbour in order to support a ferry connection between Rødbyhavn and Puttgarden. The work came to a halt during the immediate post-war years, but was resumed in 1958. Finally, on 14 May 1963, the "Vogelfluglinie" ferry connection was inaugurated. The resulting transport boom created jobs and drew in immigrants, and the population of Rødbyhavn more than doubled.

== Economy ==
Codan Medical Aps has a factory on Færgevej 4. It produces medical articles made of plastic, such as catheters, and once had half the world market in those products. Codan is headquartered in Nysted in neighboring Guldborgsund Municipality.

== See also ==
- Fehmarn Belt fixed link - under-construction immersed tunnel, which will connect the Danish island of Lolland with the German island of Fehmarn
