= Gedser–Rostock bridge =

Proposed bridge

Proposed Gedser–Rostock bridge
- Coordinates: 54.4125°N 12.0163°E

Gedser–Rostock bridge

The Gedser–Rostock bridge was a proposed project that would have linked the Danish island Falster with Rostock in Germany. The 45 km (28 mi) route across the Baltic Sea would have been part of European route E55 and the main link between Scandinavia and Berlin. It was rejected in 2007 in favour of the Fehmarn Belt tunnel, which finally began construction in 2021.

Although the distance was twice as long as the preferred route across the Fehmarn Belt, the bridge would have been be built in manageable water depths as this part of the Baltic is quite shallow. For instance the sea south of Gedser on Falster has depths of less than 10 metres (33 ft) for some 15 kilometres (9.3 mi) in this area. If the crossing had been built as a bridge, it would have been the longest bridge in the world over a body of water. Scandlines ferries continue to operate between Gedser and Rostock operating through the Fehmarn Belt line.

== Proposal ==
The case for the Gedser–Rostock bridge was that it would have been the shortest and most direct link between Scandinavia and Berlin, the high-growth areas in Eastern/Central Europe, and the Central Industrial Region in Poland. As compared to the Fehmarn Belt, the distances saved by using the Gedser-Rostock route were as follows:

- Copenhagen – Berlin = 140 kilometres (87 mi)
- Copenhagen – Munich = 160 kilometres (99 mi)
- Copenhagen – Poland = 230 kilometres (140 mi).

Supporters of the Gedser-Rostock said the Fehmarn Belt to Hamburg would be let down by that city's reputation as a bottleneck for road and rail traffic. The Danish Social Liberal Party and the Danish People's Party said on 3 June 2007 that they favoured the Gedser–Rostock bridge. They were supported by traffic researchers and a consultant from the German Ministry of Traffic.

== Rejection ==
On 4 June 2007, the then-Danish transport minister Flemming Hansen (Conservative People's Party) announced he had rejected the Gedser–Rostock proposal because it would put the process "ten years back". The Social Democrats agreed with the Government saying that "if the Germans won't join in, but wish something else, then we will of course listen".

On 29 June 2007, the Danish and German authorities agreed to support the Fehmarn Belt tunnel project rather than the Gedser–Rostock bridge. Eventually after 12 years of planning, economic summits, and international agreements, construction work on the Fehmarn Belt link officially began 1 January 2021.

== See also ==
- Fehmarn Belt fixed link
- Vogelfluglinie
- List of bridges by length
- List of longest tunnels
