= Fehmarn Sound Tunnel =

Planned tunnel in Germany

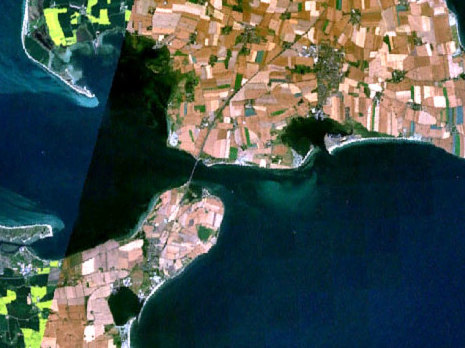
- The tunnel will connect the German mainland (to the south of the Fehmarn Sound) with the island of Fehmarn (to the north).

Overview
- Official name: Fehmarnsundtunnel
- Line: Lübeck–Puttgarden railway
- Coordinates: 54°24′0″N 11°6′50″E
- Status: Decided, not under construction yet
- Route: Bundesautobahn 1
- Crosses: Fehmarn Sound

Operation
- Opens: 2032
- Traffic: Rail and road

Technical
- Length: 1,700 m (5,600 ft)
- No. of tracks: 2
- No. of lanes: 4
- Electrified: Yes

The Fehmarn Sound Tunnel is a planned tunnel between the German mainland and the Island of Fehmarn. It was projected to be built by 2028 to supplement and to relieve the Fehmarn Sound Bridge. It should cost €718 million. The tunnel will be near Großenbrode.

== Background ==
The treaty of 2008 between Germany and Denmark provided that the hinterland connection to the Fehmarnbelt link was to be expanded on the German side, but the Fehmarnsund Bridge was to remain a two-lane road and a single-track railway. The bridge was considered to be able to handle the increase in traffic.

It was later decided that the increase in traffic could not be handled by the existing Fehmarn Sound Bridge, especially rail traffic.

In March 2020, the German Federal Ministry for Transport and Digital Infrastructure and Deutsche Bahn announced that they had compared all investigated variants and opted for an immersed tunnel for road and rail (estimated cost: 714 million euros) and that the Fehmarnsund Bridge would be preserved.

In 2025 when the tunnel was still not approved by authorities it was revealed that it would not be opened in 2029 as it was then planned but in 2032, which would delay train traffic along the new connection until then. Road traffic can use the old bridge.

== Design ==
Close-up showing the Fehmarn Sound

The design of the tunnel is very similar to the standard elements of the Fehmarn Belt Fixed Link, which is currently being built. That is to be expected since both tunnels have been designed by groups with COWI involved. It has even been proposed to have the needed elements built at the factory that makes the elements for the Fehmarn Belt Fixed Link since the Fehmarn Sound is around 900 m, and the elements for the Fehmarn Belt Fixed Link is 217 m and so the Fehmarn Sound would consist of four or five such elements. Also, suggestions have been made to preserve the factory for future projects.
