= Großenbrode =

- Municipality
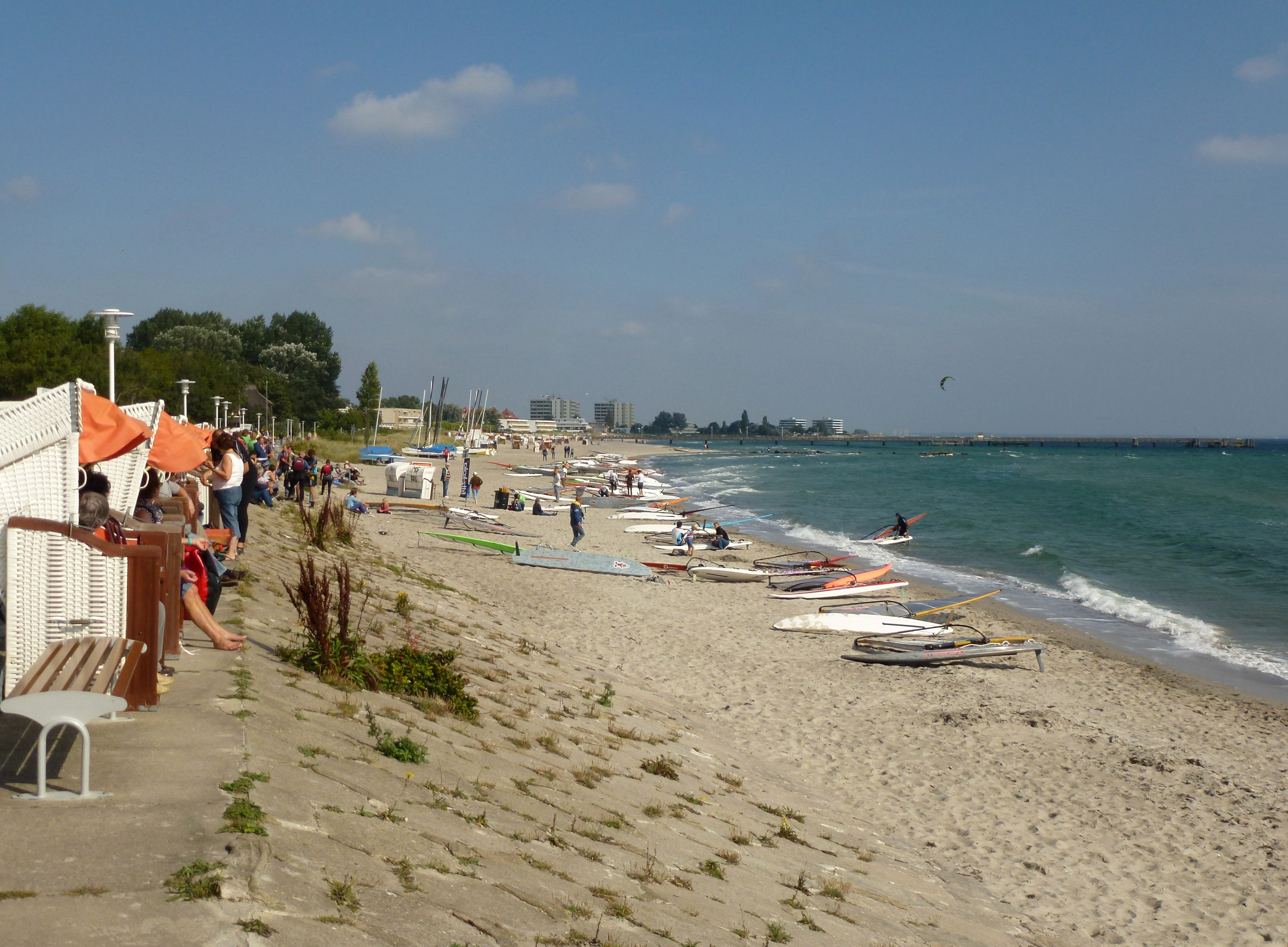
- Beach at Großenbrode

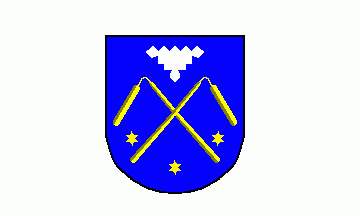
- Flag Coat of arms

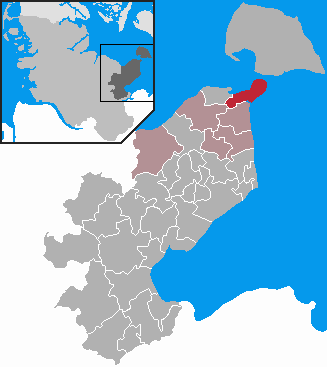
- Location of Großenbrode within Ostholstein district
- Interactive map of Großenbrode
- Location within Germany Location within Schleswig-Holstein
- Coordinates: 54°22′12″N 11°5′6″E
- Country: Germany
- State: Schleswig-Holstein
- District: Ostholstein
- Municipal assoc.: Oldenburg-Land

Government
  - Mayor: Jens Reise (CDU)

Area
  - Total: 20.98 km^{2} (8.10 sq mi)
- Elevation: 16 m (52 ft)

Population (2025-12-31)
  - Total: 2,167
  - Density: 103.3/km^{2} (267.5/sq mi)
- Time zone: UTC+01:00 (CET)
  - Summer (DST): UTC+02:00 (CEST)
- Postal codes: 23775
- Dialling codes: 04367
- Vehicle registration: OH
- Website: www.grossenbrode.de

Großenbrode is a municipality in the district of Ostholstein, in Schleswig-Holstein, Germany. It is situated on the Baltic Sea coast, opposite Fehmarn, approx. 8 km (5 mi) east of Heiligenhafen. Until 1963 it had a ferry connection to Gedser in Denmark. After World War II there was no ferry connection between West Germany and Denmark - the ferry port Warnemünde (near Rostock) now being in the communist east. Großenbrode was chosen as the site for a temporary ferry connection for the 3-hour crossing to Gedser. After the Fehmarnsund bridge was built in 1963, the ferryport moved to Puttgarden on Fehmarn. Großenbrode is planned to be the site of a portal of the Fehmarn Sound Tunnel by 2028.

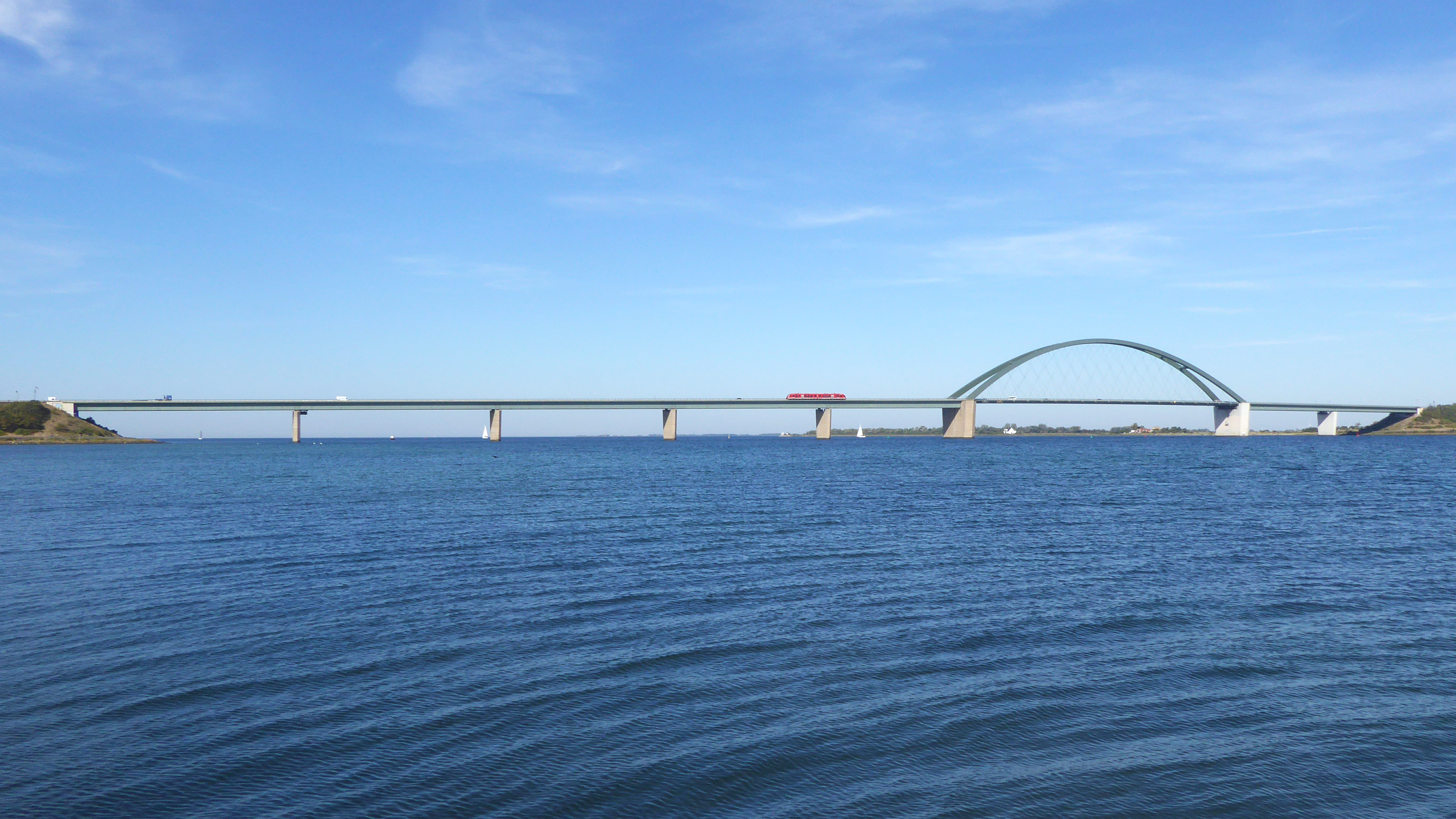
The Fehmarn Sound Bridge, as seen from Großenbrode

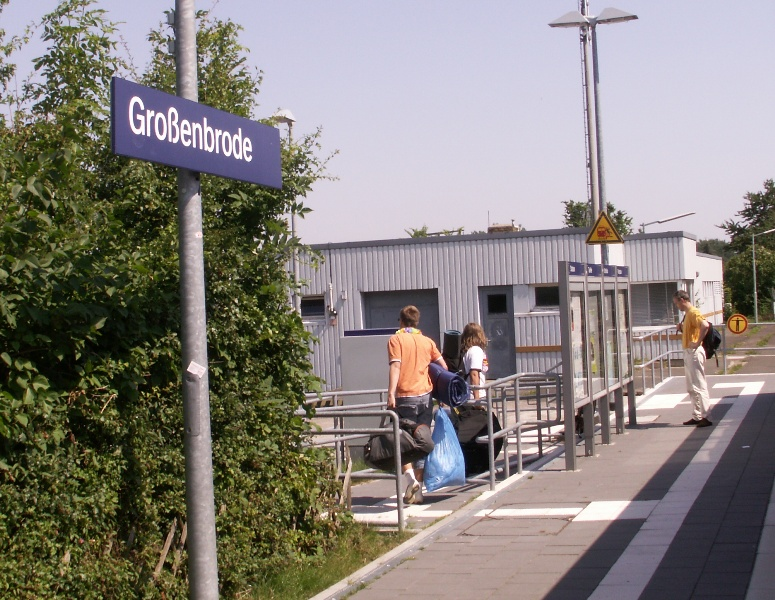
Großenbrode railway station

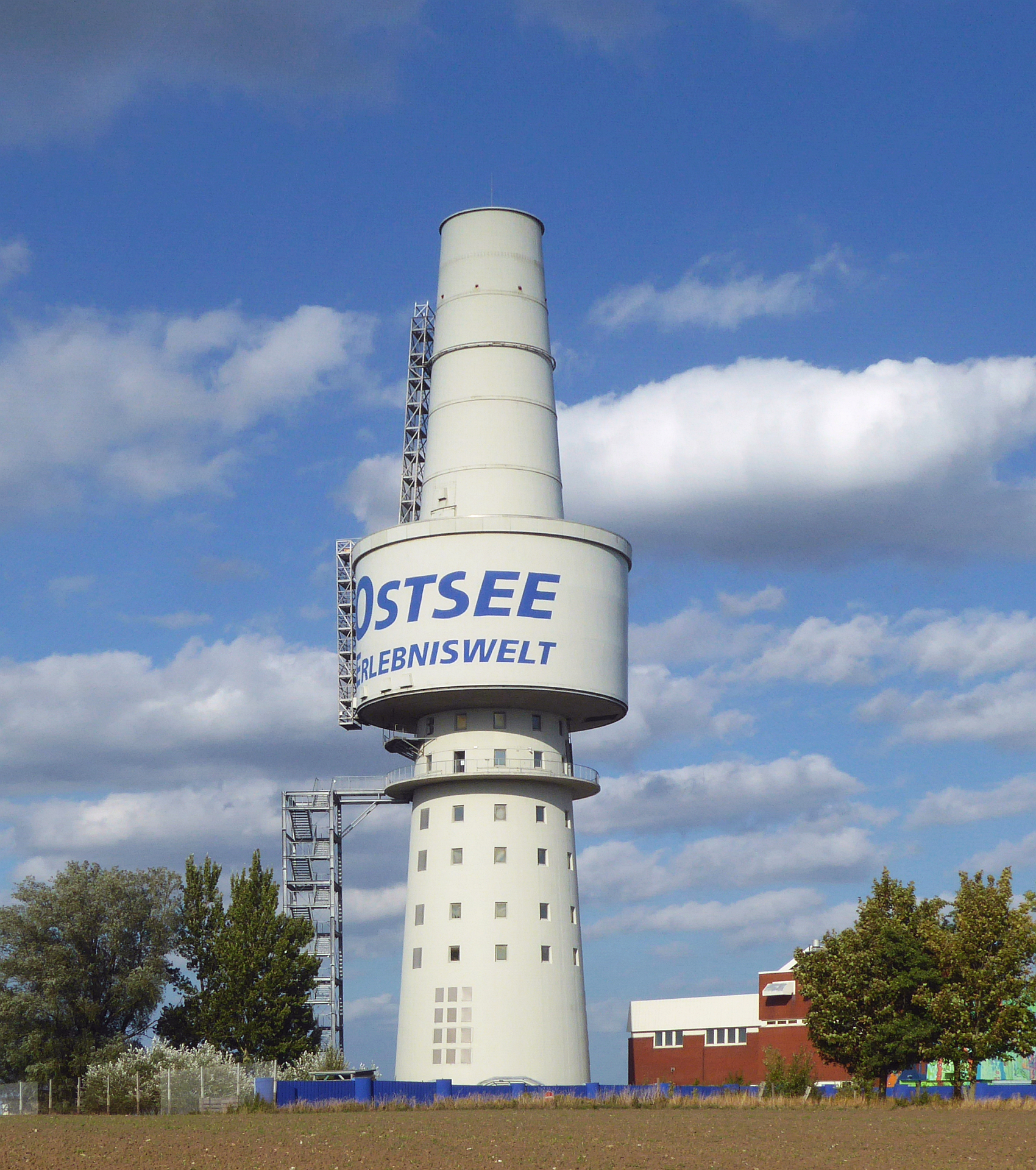
A former reconnaissance tower, (Aufklärungsturm), which now hosts a restaurant
