= Fehmarn Belt =

Strait in Germany and Denmark

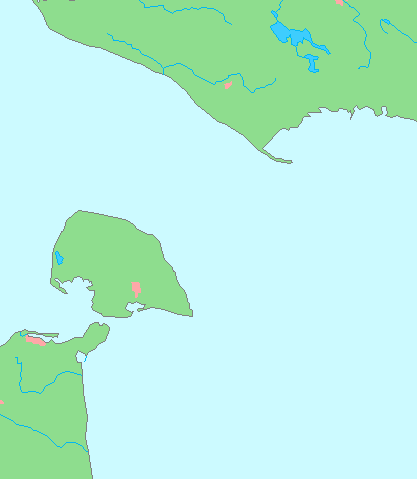
- The Fehmarn Belt. The German island of Fehmarn is located to the south and the Danish island of Lolland to the north

- Location within Germany
- Coordinates: 54°34′N 11°17′E
- Type: strait
- Basin countries: Germany; Denmark
- Max. length: 25 km (16 mi)
- Min. width: 18.6 km (11.6 mi)
- Max. depth: 30 m (98 ft)

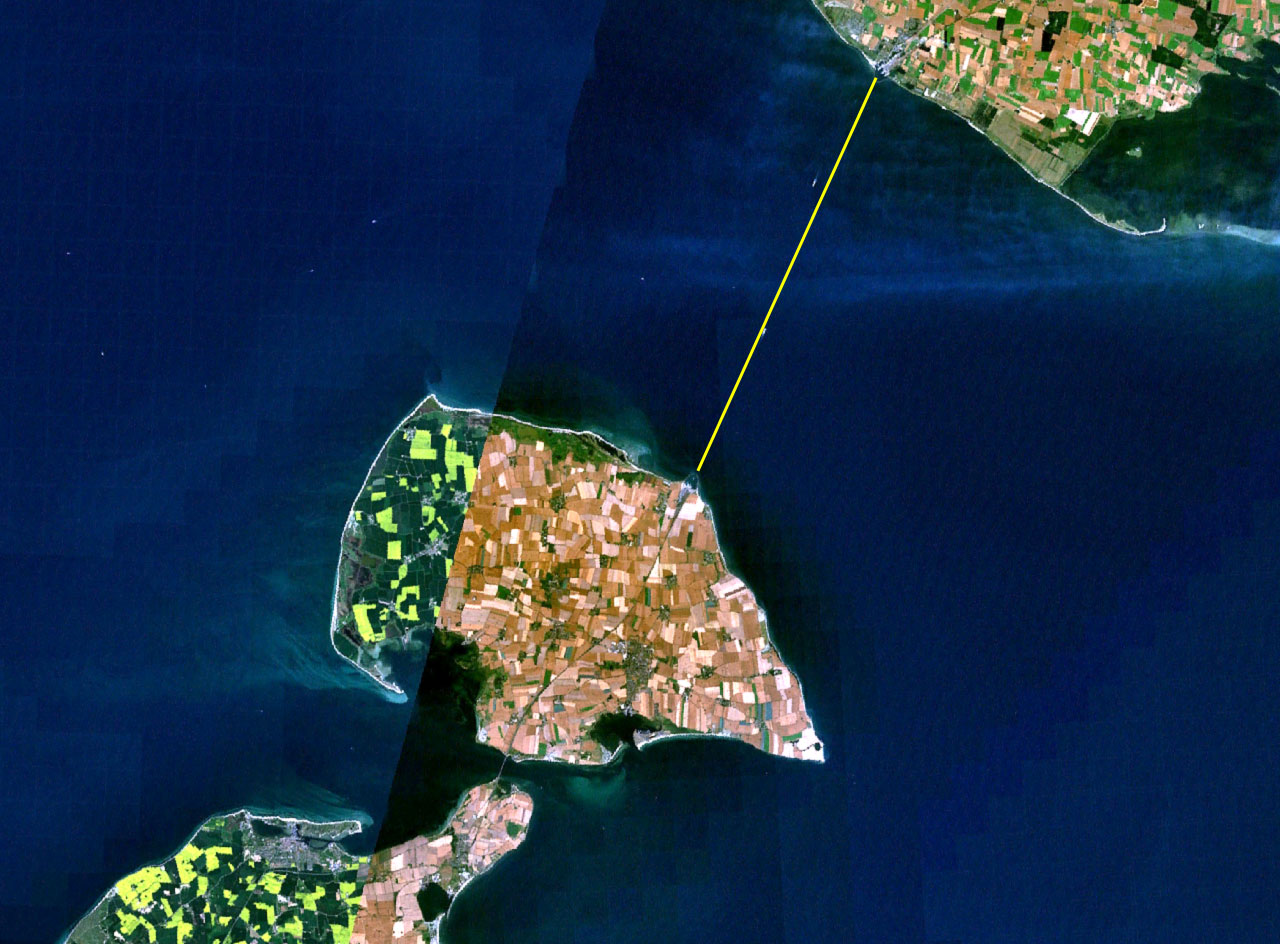
Location of the ferry route.

Fehmarn Belt (German pronunciation) (Danish: Femern Bælt, former spelling Femer Bælt; Low German: Femernbelt) is a strait connecting the Bay of Kiel and the Bay of Mecklenburg in the western part of the Baltic Sea between the German island of Fehmarn and the Danish island of Lolland. Ferries operated by Scandlines connect Puttgarden and Rødby on the two islands.

The strait features an 18-kilometre-wide (11 mi) wide area with depths of 20–30 metres (66–98 ft). Currents in the strait are weak and mostly dependent on wind.

== Swimming ==
It was initially swum across by Christof Wandratsch.

== Tunnel ==
The Danish and German governments agreed on 29 June 2007 to build a fixed link to replace the current ferry route.

In 2011, the Danish parliament voted overwhelmingly (with seven of eight parties supporting) for the €5.1 billion project that was initially intended to open in 2020. The tunnel is to have three separate bores, two containing two motorway lanes each, and one with a double-track railway line. Construction started on 1 January 2021, and the tunnel is expected to open in 2029.

The tunnel will allow crossing between Rødbyhavn and Puttgarten in 10 minutes by car, or seven minutes by train, replacing a 45-minute ferry crossing.

== Famous shipwrecks ==
- 13 October 1644 The Danish men-of-war Delmenhorst, Lindormen and the Dutch Swarte Arendt was sunk during the Battle of Fehmarn (1644)
- 21 July 1932 The German school ship Niobe capsized during a white squall

== See also ==
- Fehmarn Belt Lightship
