= Puttgarden =

Village in Schleswig-Holstein, Germany

Coordinates: 54°30′N 11°13′E

Location of Puttgarden in Germany

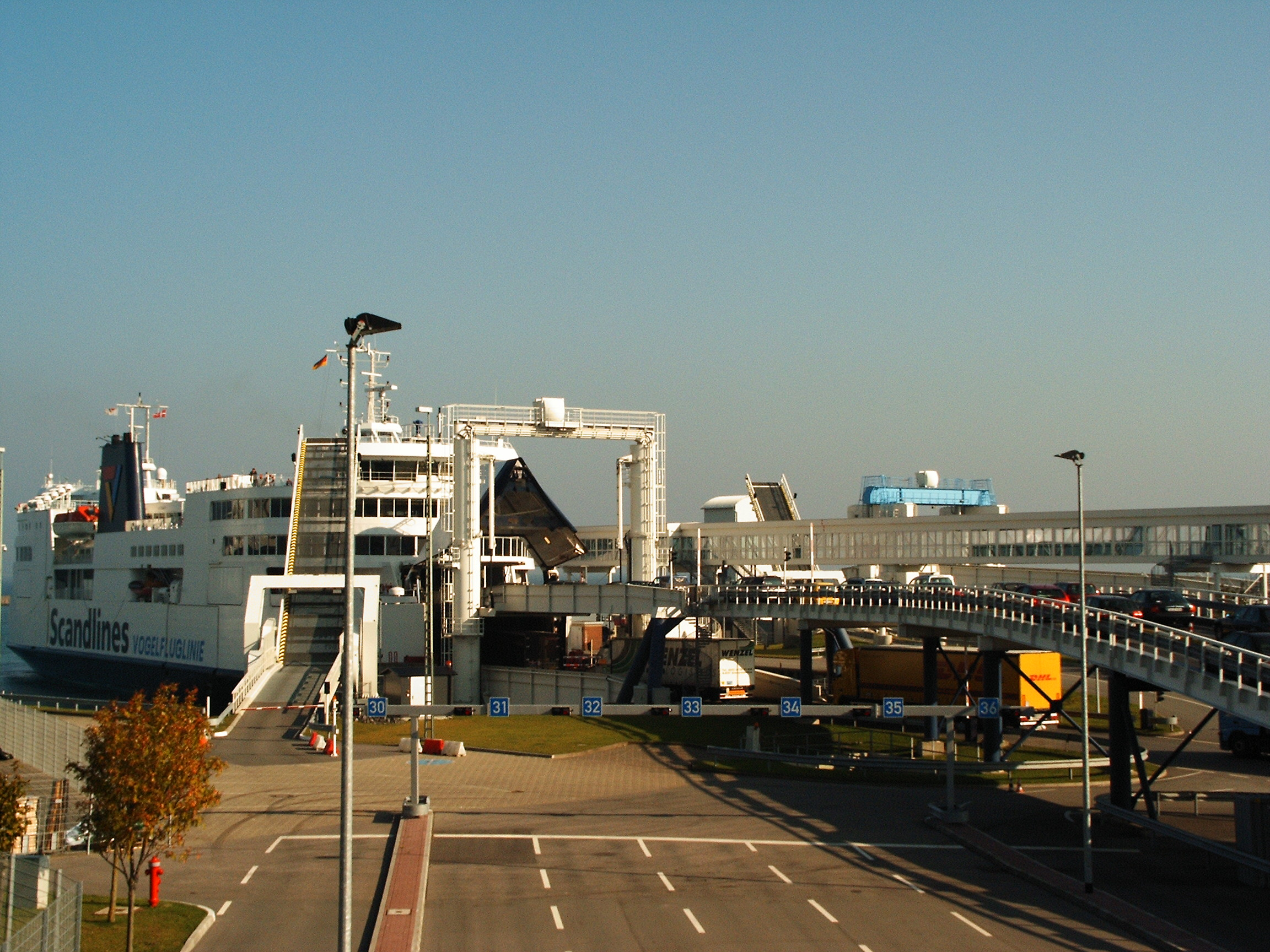
Ferry loading

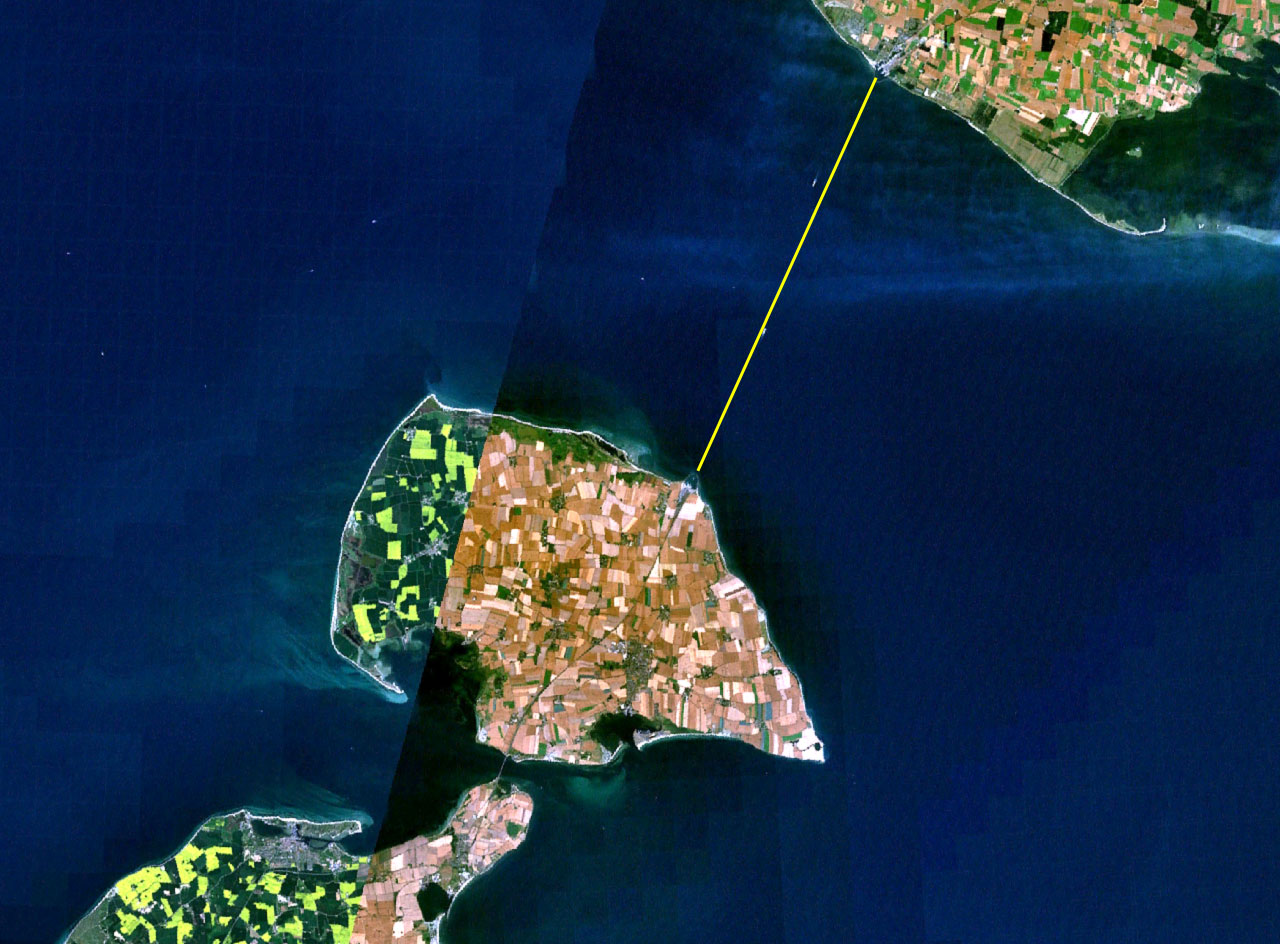
Satellite image of the Vogelfluglinie

Puttgarden is a ferry harbour and a village on the German island of Fehmarn. It lies on an important route between Germany and Denmark known as the Vogelfluglinie which crosses the 18 kilometres (11 mi) strait, the Fehmarnbelt, to Rødby on the island of Lolland.

== Overview ==
From 1945 to 1963, the ferry route from West Germany to Denmark had run between Großenbrode and Gedser. A train ferry terminal was built in Puttgarden in 1961-63 and at the same time Fehmarn was connected to the mainland by bridge. Since the completion of the Great Belt Fixed Link in Denmark, the route via Puttgarden became less used by trains and Puttgarden station closed in 2022. The harbour is still used by Scandlines ferries, with a fleet of four ferries giving one connection every 30 minutes, 24 hours a day.

== Tunnel to Denmark ==
A tunnel connection is under construction across the Fehmarn Belt. Originally planned as a bridge, the solution eventually chosen was an immersed tunnel comprising both a road and a rail link. The Danish government is financing construction. The fixed link will have road fees comparable to the ferry fees. It is planned to be completed in 2029.

== Navy station Marienleuchte ==
East of Puttgarden is Marienleuchte navy station loacted. Imperial German Navy established this coast station in 1908 to controll the geostratic important Fehmarn Belt. The station was a reconnaissance facility during the Cold War to locate submarines and other seagoing vessels of the Warsaw Pact in the Baltic Sea and to intercept military communications. For submarien detection a underwater surveillance systems "Holzauge" (Wooden Eye) and the U.S.-made "Miss Beta" were used. Both system relied on underwater acoustic devices to detect and track submarine and naval movements. It targeted traffic moving through the strategically narrow Fehmarnbelt strait in the Baltic Sea.

In 1993 German navy build a sensitiv passiv sonar (DWQX-12) at Marienleuchte station financed by NATO. The system is able to detected and identifie ships and submariens in the area around Fehmarn. Most important is a system called "Großes Seeohr" (Great Abalone/Sea Ear) consisting of three acoustic sensors laid under the Fehmarnbelt shipping route.

In 2006, Marienleuchte was assigned to the Submarine Training Center and received several technological upgrades. Marienleuchte navy station is observing the russian shadow fleet more intensiv since 2022.

== See also ==
- Puttgarden station
- List of bridge-tunnels
