= Manninen =

Manninen is a Finnish surname. Notable people with the surname include:

- Emilija Manninen (born 1981), Estonian hurdler
- Hannes Manninen (born 1946), Finnish politician
- Hannu Manninen (born 1978), Finnish Nordic combined athlete
- Ilmari Manninen (1894–1935), Finnish ethnographer
- Jarmo Manninen (born 1951), Finnish retired football player
- Mauno Manninen (1915–1969), Finnish theatre director, poet and painter
- Mikko Manninen (born 1985), Finnish professional football striker
- Oskari Manninen (born 1991), Finnish ice hockey player
- Otto Manninen (1872–1950), Finnish writer
- Pirjo Manninen (born 1981), Finnish cross country skier
- Raimo Manninen (alpine skier) (1940–2009), Finnish alpine skier
- Raimo Manninen (athlete) (born 1955), Finnish retired javelin thrower
- Uolevi Manninen (1937–2009), Finnish basketball player and businessman
