= Helena Vovsová =

Czech resistance member (1926–2026)

Helena Vovsová (12 February 1926 – 6 April 2026) was a Czech resistance member during the Nazi German occupation of Czechoslovakia.

== Biography ==
Vovsová was born on Štvanice island on 12 February 1926, and raised by her family in Panenské Břežany.

Following the annexation of Czechoslovakia and the establishment of the occupied Protectorate of Bohemia and Moravia, Vovsová, who was just 15 years old at the time, began working at Prague Castle, the official residence of the Nazi German Reich Protector of Bohemia and Moravia, where she first worked under Konstantin von Neurath and then for the notorious SS officer, Reinhard Heydrich. Vovsová helped the Czech and Czech Jewish prisoners who were forced to work at the castle. The castle's Jewish prisoners were forced to live in a stable on the Prague Castle's grounds and were forbidden to have contact with non-Jewish Czechoslovak employees. Vovsová risked her life by smuggling food and other provisions to the Jewish prisoners, including medicine and flea repellent, past SS guards guarding the stable.

The Jewish prison workers at Prague Castle were deported to the Auschwitz concentration camp and the Theresienstadt Ghetto in 1943. Out of the 150 Jewish workers departed from Prague Castle, only 27 prisoners survived the Holocaust and the end of Nazi German occupation. Following the end of World War II, several of the Jewish prisoners thanked Vovsová for her help.

Vovsová's actions on behalf of the Jewish workers imprisoned at Prague Castle were largely forgotten for nearly sixty years. However, in 2005, the Czech government officially recognized her as a member of the Czechoslovak resistance during World War II. Vovsová was further awarded the Golden Linden Award from the Ministry of Defence of the Czech Republic for her contributions to human rights and the defense of the country during the German occupation.

Vovsová died on 6 April 2026, at the age of 100. Her death was announced in the Memory of Nations, a Prague-based archive run by the Post Bellum non-profit organization.
