= Anni Swan =

Finnish writer (1875–1958)

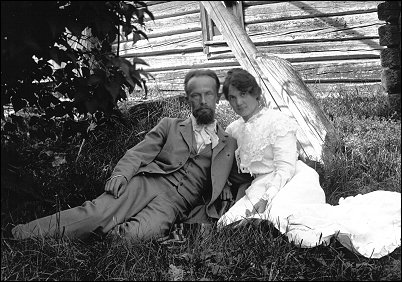
- Otto Manninen and Anni Manninen in ca. 1906.
- Born: 4 January 1875; Helsinki, Finland
- Died: 24 March 1958 (aged 83); Helsinki, Finland

Anni Emilia Swan (married name Anni Manninen; 4 January 1875 in Helsinki – 24 March 1958 in Helsinki) was a Finnish writer. Swan wrote many books for children and young adults, was a journalist for children's magazines and worked as a translator. She is considered the creator of Finnish literature for girls.

== Overview ==
Swan's father was Carl Gustaf Swan, a well-known figure of culture of his time, who founded the first newspaper of Lappeenranta. Anni Swan's mother Emilia Malin was a literature enthusiast and taught all of her nine daughters to read fairy tales and narratives at an early age.

The family lived in Lappeenranta from 1884 until the turn of the century. Swan went to an all-girls school in Mikkeli and graduated in 1895 from Helsingin Suomalainen Yhteiskoulu. She became an elementary school teacher in Jyväskylä in 1900 and worked in Helsinki from 1901 to 1916. In 1907, she married writer Otto Manninen. They had three sons, the youngest of which was the theatre director Mauno Manninen.

Swan's first collection of fairy tales, simply called Satuja ("Fairy Tales"), was published in 1901. Her first book for young adults, which was partly based on her father's recollections, was Tottisalmen perillinen ("The Heir of Tottisalmi"), published in 1917. This book is about an orphan farm-hand, Yrjö, who turns out to be an heir to a large fortune. Her other well-known books are Iris rukka ("Poor Iris"), Ollin oppivuodet ("Olli's Apprentenceship") and Sara ja Sarri ("Sara and Sarri"). In many of her books she writes about juxtapositions like poor and rich people, good and bad people. Often the protagonist is experiencing challenges when suddenly meeting people of higher or lower social class. The courageous and resourceful main characters in Swan's young-adult fiction had been a role-model for many heroes and heroines in later young-adult fiction.

Swan was a journalist for the children's magazines Pääskynen (1907–1918) and Nuorten toveri/Sirkka (1919–1945). She furthermore translated, among others, Brothers Grimm and the tales of Br'er Rabbit and Br'er Fox as well as the first Finnish translation of Alice's Adventures in Wonderland.

Every 3 years, since 1961, an award named after her called the Anni Swan -mitali, has been given to a distinctive young-adult fiction of high quality, published in Finland and written in either Finnish or Swedish.

== Books ==
Children

- Satuja I–III (1901–1905).
- Pieniä satuja I–V (1906).
- Lasten-näytelmiä (1910).
- Tarinoita lapsille (1912).
- Satuja ja tarinoita (1917).
- Satuja (1920).
- Satuja VI (1923).
- Lastennäytelmiä II (1923).
- Kotavuoren satuja ja tarinoita (1957).

Young adults

- Tottisalmen perillinen (1914).
- Iiris rukka (1916).
- Kaarinan kesäloma (1918).
- Ollin oppivuodet (1919).
- Pikkupappilassa (1922).
- Ulla ja Mark (1924).
- Sara ja Sarri (1927).
- Sara ja Sarri matkustavat (1930).
- Me kolme ja Ritvan suojatit (1937).
- Pauli on koditon (1946).
- Arnellin perhe (1949).
