= Mauno Manninen =

Finnish poet, theatre director (1915–1969)

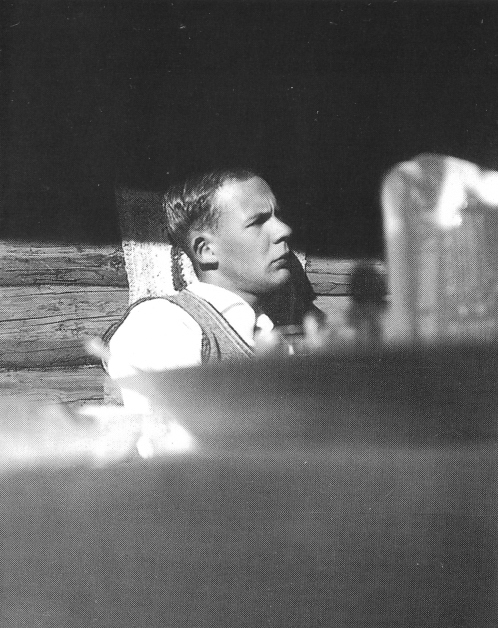
Mauno Manninen in 1937

Erkki Mauno Gustaf Manninen (26 June 1915 – 14 September 1969) was a Finnish poet, painter and theatre director. He was the son of poet Otto Manninen and writer Anni Swan. Manninen is best known as the founder of Intimiteatteri, which was one of the leading theatres in Helsinki from 1949 to 1987.

In 1965 Manninen married Lina Heydrich who was the widow of assassinated SS-Obergruppenführer Reinhard Heydrich. They met while Heydrich was on a holiday trip to Finland and got married for the purpose of Heydrich changing her last name. According to the Finnish art historian Pirjo Hämäläinen, Manninen read an article about Lina Heydrich, became interested in her and traveled to meet Heydrich on the island of Fehmarn in Germany.

== Anthologies ==
- Rautaiset tornit, 1944.
- Kaks silmää vain, 1965.
