= St. Nicholas Church, Fehmarn =

St. Nicholas Church, Burg auf Fehmarn
- St. Nikolai Kirche
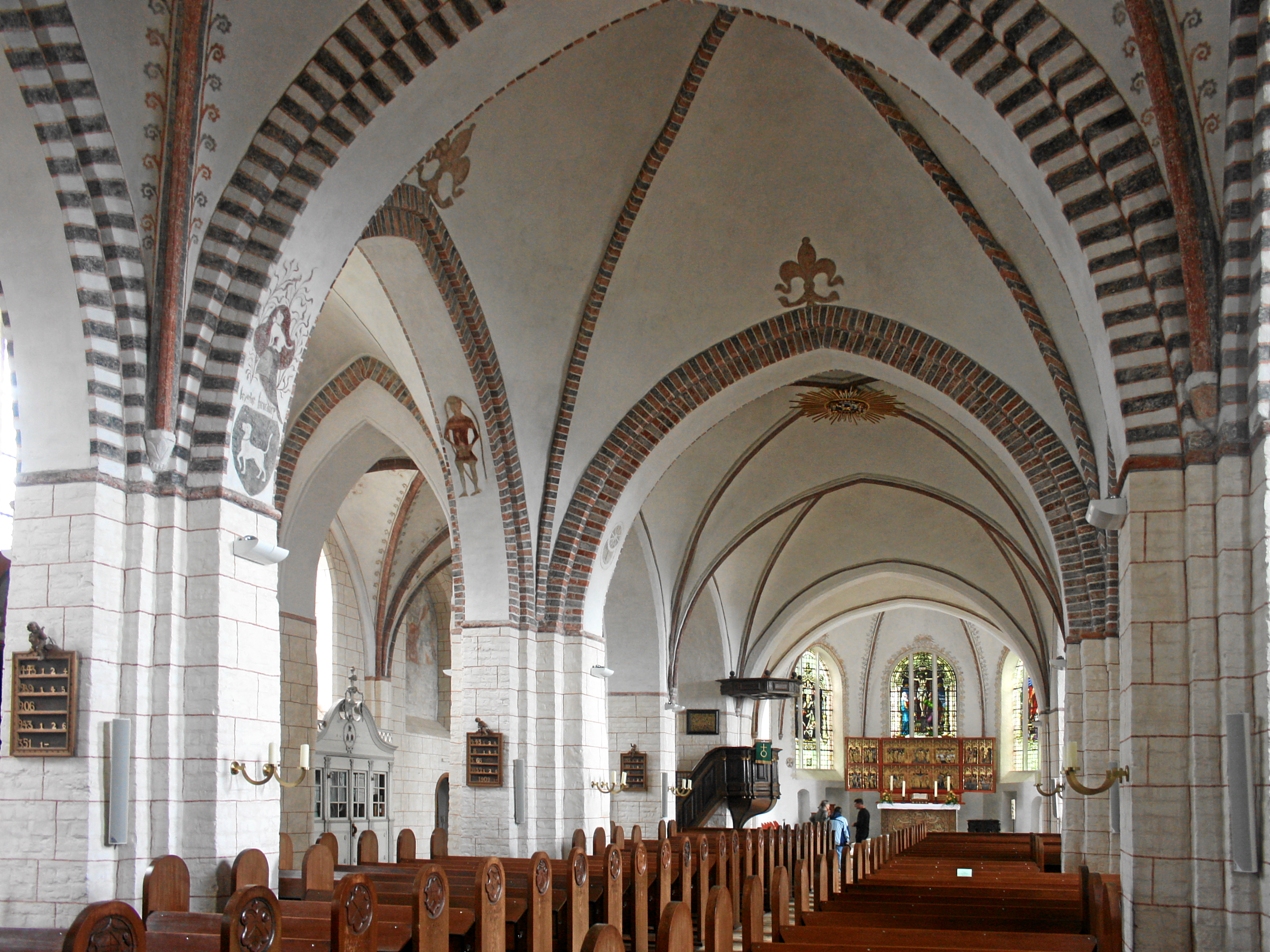
- Inside the church

- Location within Schleswig-Holstein Location within Germany
- 54°26′10″N 11°11′47″E
- Country: Germany
- Denomination: Lutheran
- Previous denomination: Catholic
- Website: www.st-nikolai-kirche-burg.de/st-nikolai-kirche

History
- Founded: 1230 (estimated)

St. Nicholas Church (St. Nikolai Kirche) is a church in the city of Burg on the German Baltic island of Fehmarn.

== Description ==
The church is on the island of Fehmarn in the Baltic. The island is joined by a bridge to the mainland, and there are plans to link the island by a submerged tunnel to Denmark. There is a bronze font in the church which dates from 1391. It is not certain how it arrived at the church, but the casting carried an inscription which records that the font was given by Korp Benno the Bishop of Arosia. Another significant item of the 14th century is a polyptych which has fourteen panels today but it is believed to have lost further panels.

In addition there is another stone font that was rediscovered when nearby buildings were being built. It has since had a base added, and small restorations have also been made.

The date that the church was started is unknown, but it has been estimated at 1230, making the building the second oldest church on the island. The first construction may have been in 1250. The church was dedicated to Saint Nicholas, who is the patron saint of sea travellers and grain sellers.

The size of the church was increased in 1470 and in 1508 the tower of the church was built.

Amongst the church's artefacts on display is a large chest that was used for storing the parishioners contributions. After each service the collection bag would be emptied into the chest, but it would only be opened once a year. When it was opened then the funds would be distributed to those in need.
