= Wallnau Waterbird Reserve =

Coordinates: 54°28′22″N 11°01′17″E

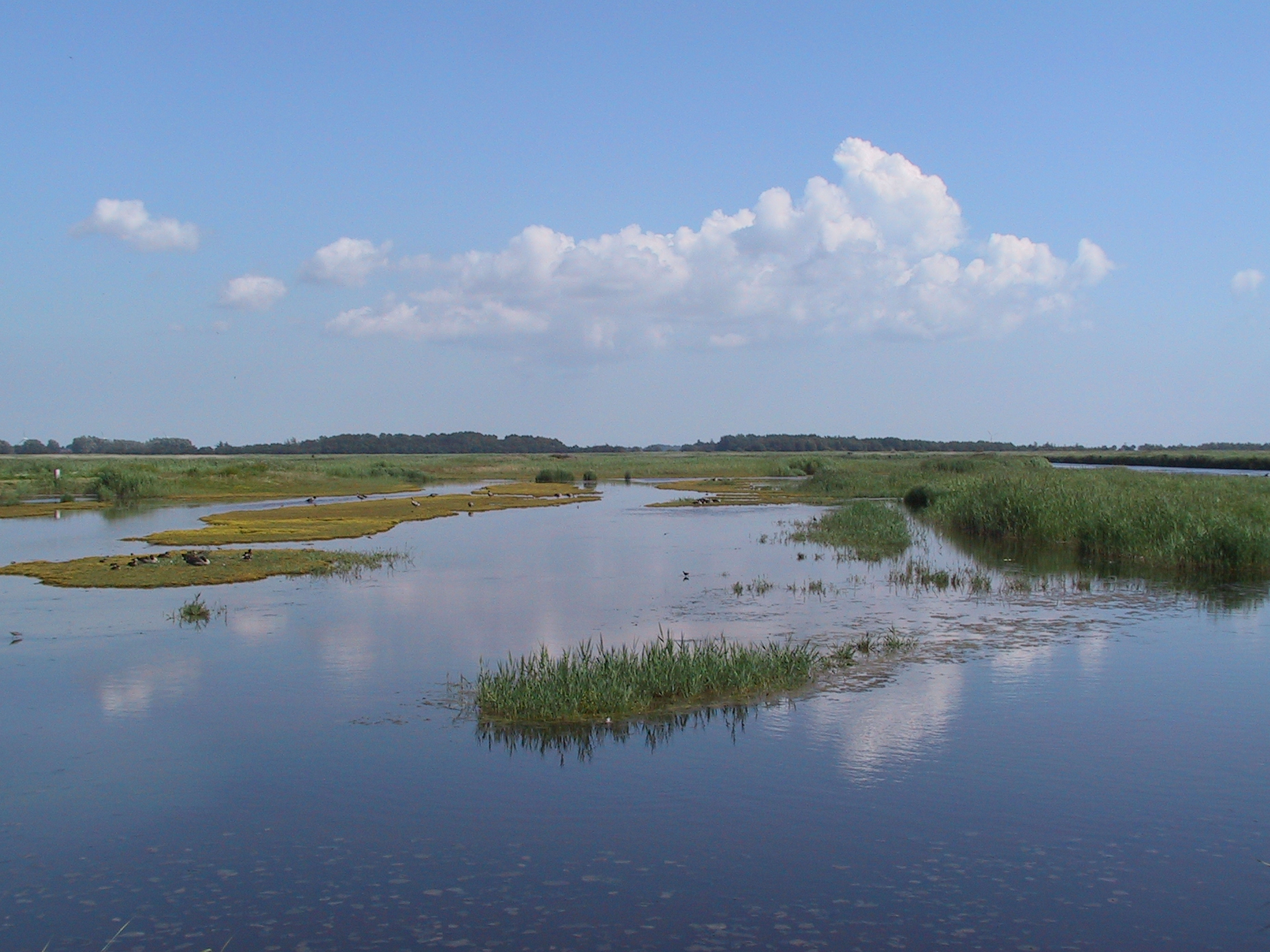
View from the Eck-Haid (hide) looking northeast

The Wallnau Waterbird Reserve (German: Wasservogelreservat Wallnau) is one of the most important reserves for migratory birds in Germany and the largest of NABU's nature conservation centres. The former pond estate of Wallnau lies on the west coast of the Baltic island of Fehmarn and covers, in its core zone, an area of just under 300 hectares (740 acres), of ponds, reed beds and meadows as well as part of the Baltic Sea and its fringing beaches. The nature conservation centre houses an exhibition on bird migration, a small restaurant and seminar rooms. Paid and volunteer workers look after conservation-related work and public relations. The centre is certified as the provider of education for sustainable development.

== History ==
The area, which consists of ponds, reed beds, wet meadows and small groves of trees, was originally a bay in the Baltic Sea before a spit developed and separated what became an inland lake from the sea 400 years ago.

In the 19th century the area was drained by engineer and surveyor, Gustav Kröhnke, and numerous fish ponds were created over an area of 375 hectares (930 acres).

The drained lake was used for a long time for agricultural purposes before it was purchased in 1975 by the German Society for the Protection of Birds (Deutscher Bund für Vogelschutz) and the district of Ostholstein. NABU bought the site in 1976 and, by 1977, it had been designated as a nature reserve.

This secured the protection of breeding and migrant bird species. In order to optimise the habitat for these birds, landscaping measures were carried out in several areas. The reserve also took part in a LIFE project for improving the protection of the Baltic Sea lagoons, cooperating with Danish and Swedish partners. The head of NABU's Wallnau Waterbird Reserve since March 2008 has been Malte Siegert.

In March 2010 NABU Wallnau was given responsibility for three other nature reserves on Fehmarn, thus creating a linked conservation system on the island. One reserve lay just to the north of NABU's existing nature reserve of Wallnau/Fehmarn. The two others are located between the Wallnau Nature Reserve and the NABU's Krummsteert-Sulsdorf Wiek / Fehmarn Nature Reserve. The peninsula of Spitzenort and the islands in the Lemkenhafener Wiek, which are home to inter alia a large colony of herring gulls, will also be looked after by NABU Wallnau in the future. The reserves fall under the EU's Birds Directive and are Special Areas of Conservation in the Europe-wide conservation network known as Natura 2000.

In 1970 the Love and Peace Festival, a music festival lasting several days took place on the edge of the present NABU reserve. This event was the last one at which Jimi Hendrix performed before his death. Today, a memorial stone commemorates the event.

== Wallnau / Fehmarn Nature Reserve ==
On 23 December 1977 ownership of the 298 hectares (740 acres) site, designated as a nature reserve by the state of Schleswig-Holstein, was transferred to NABU.

== Conservation ==
Over 270 species of bird use the terrain of the nature reserve as a resting area during their migration. Around 100 species breed in Wallnau.

Data from the continual waterbird numbers and mapping is archived and passed on to the collection points. Employees of the reserve carry out tasks for the Nature Conservation Service of the state of Schleswig Holstein. The team of the waterbird reserve undertakes specialist support of the Wallnau nature reserve and the site support of the reserves of Grüner Brink and Krummsteert/Sulsdorfer Wiek on the island.

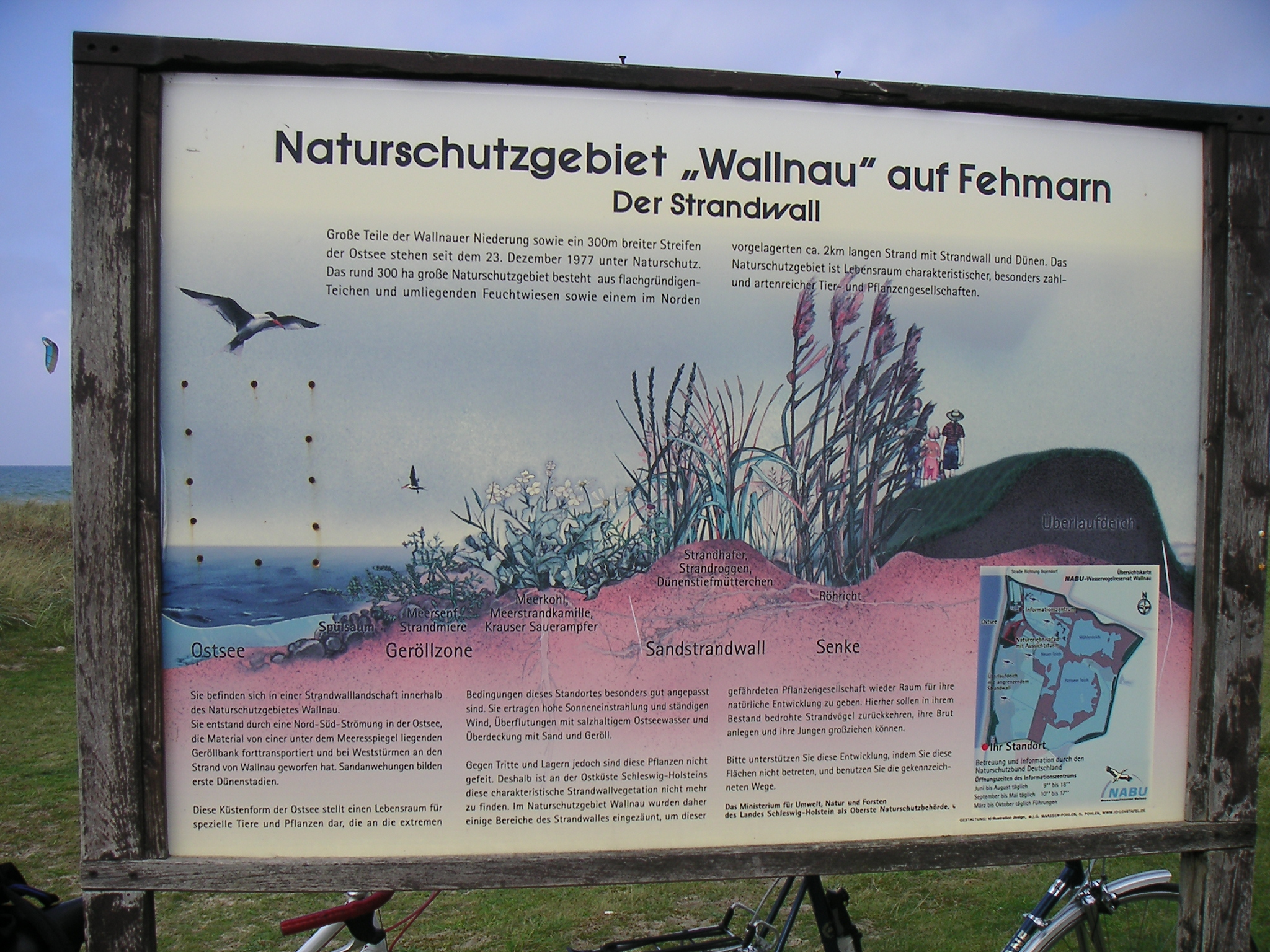
Information board

== Importance ==
Because of its favourable location on the migration path of migrating birds, Wallnau is a much sought-after resting place and is also used as a nesting ground in the summer by rare birds like the red-necked grebe and little tern. The nature reserve can be viewed at any time from a path on the crest of the summer dyke. NABU's information centre is open from March to October and there are also guided walks through the area.
