= Glambæk =

Coordinates: 54°24′44″N 11°12′30″E

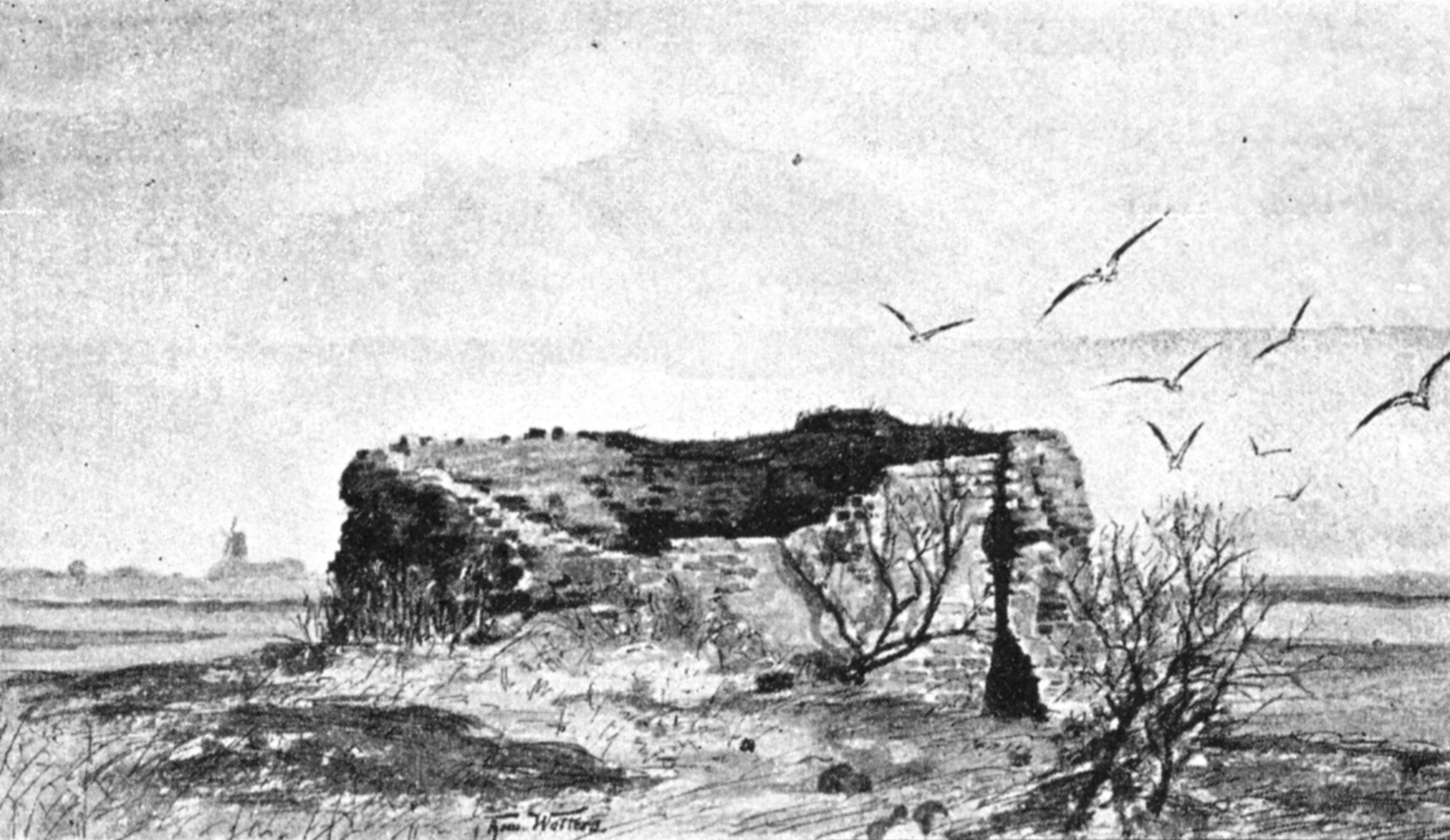
Picture of the castle ruins as they appeared in 1895

Glambæk (German: Burg Glambek) was a castle in Femern (German: Fehmarn) on the north-east coast of Schleswig-Holstein in what is now Germany.

Glambæk was built in the 13th century by Valdemar Sejr and protected the land between Baltic Sea and Burger Binnensee.

The island was captured at the beginning of the 15th century, but Erik of Pommern took it and the castle back again in 1416.

During the Thirty Years' War, it was captured and destroyed in 1627 by Johann Tserclaes, Count of Tilly.
