= Vadersdorf =

Village in Schleswig-Holstein, Germany

Coordinates: 54°29′N 11°08′E

Vadersdorf is a village on the island of Fehmarn in the German state of Schleswig-Holstein. It is located in the district of East Holstein. The village occupies an area of 7.2 km². In 2003, the population of the village was approximately 130.
