= Lina Heydrich =

Wife of Reinhard Heydrich (1911–1985)

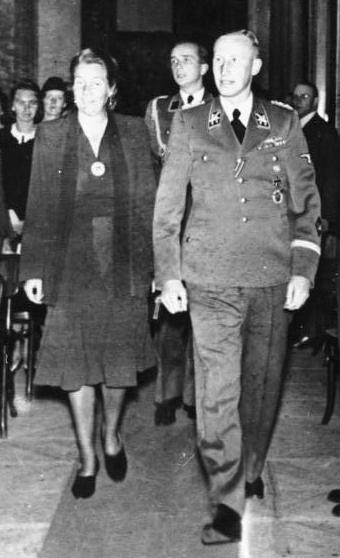
- In Prague, the day before the attack that led to his death, Reinhard Heydrich and wife Lina attend a concert of Richard Bruno Heydrich's music in the Waldstein Palace, 26 May 1942.
- Born: Lina Mathilde von Osten; 14 June 1911; Fehmarn, Province of Schleswig-Holstein, German Empire
- Died: 14 August 1985 (aged 74); Fehmarn, Schleswig-Holstein, West Germany
- Other name: Lina Manninen
- Spouses: Reinhard Heydrich (m. 1931; died 1942) Mauno Manninen (m. 1965; died 1969)
- Children: 4

Lina Mathilde Manninen (née von Osten, formerly Heydrich; 14 June 1911 – 14 August 1985) was the wife of Reinhard Heydrich, head of the Reich Security Main Office and a central figure in Nazi Germany. The daughter of a minor German aristocrat (he worked as a village schoolteacher), she joined the Nazi Party in 1929 and met Reinhard Heydrich in December 1930. The two wed on 26 December 1931 and had four children. She published a memoir in 1976. She defended the reputation of her first husband (Heydrich) until her death at age 74 in August 1985 in Fehmarn.

== Nazi Party membership ==
Lina's older brother Hans had joined the Nazi Party and was a member of the Sturmabteilung (SA). He spoke highly of the movement to Lina and she attended a Party rally in 1929 where Adolf Hitler spoke. Shortly thereafter, Lina von Osten joined the Nazi Party with party membership number 1,201,380.

On 6 December 1930, aged 19, she attended a rowing-club ball in Kiel and met then Naval Lieutenant Heydrich there. They became romantically involved and soon announced their engagement on 18 December 1930.

In 1931, he was charged with "conduct unbecoming to an officer and gentleman" for breaking an engagement promise to a woman he had known for six months before the engagement to Lina. Admiral Erich Raeder dismissed Heydrich from the navy that April. The dismissal devastated Heydrich, who found himself without career prospects.

Lina persuaded Heydrich to look into the recently formed Schutzstaffel (SS) as a career option. During 1931, SS Leader Heinrich Himmler began setting up a counterintelligence division of the SS. Acting on the advice of his associate Karl von Eberstein, a friend of the Heydrich family, Himmler agreed to interview Heydrich, but cancelled their appointment at the last minute. Lina ignored this message, packed Reinhard's suitcase, and sent him to Munich.

Eberstein met Heydrich at the railway station and took him to see Himmler. Himmler asked Heydrich to convey his ideas for developing an SS intelligence service. Himmler was so impressed that he hired Heydrich immediately as the chief of the new SS 'Ic Service' or Intelligence Service (which later became known as the Sicherheitsdienst; SD). He returned to Hamburg with the good news. Heydrich entered into the Hamburg SS on 14 July. In August, he was transferred to Munich where he lived alone in a boarding house, which rented rooms to unmarried SS men. Lina later stated that Reinhard Heydrich never read Hitler's book, Mein Kampf. He and Lina wed at a small church in Großenbrode on 26 December 1931.

== Family ==
Lina Heydrich gave birth to two sons, Klaus (born 17 June 1933) and Heider (born 23 December 1934). By the late 1930s, the duties of Reinhard Heydrich led him to work long hours and often be away from home. This left Lina at home with the children and having to run the household alone. This placed a serious strain on their marriage that nearly resulted in divorce. However, the reconciled Heydrich couple had another child, a daughter named Silke (born 9 April 1939). Reinhard proudly showed off his baby daughter and they had a close relationship.

In 1941 the family moved to the Lower Castle of Panenské Břežany (Czech:Dolní zámek v Panenských Břežanech) which was originally owned by Ferdinand Bloch-Bauer, a Jewish magnate in the European sugar industry. Following the Nazi occupation of Czechoslovakia in 1939, his property was confiscated by the Nazis after he fled to Switzerland. From 1939 to 1942 the Lower Castle was the official residence of the Reichsprotektor of Bohemia and Moravia and their families. Konstantin von Neurath lived there until 1941 before Heydrich took over. Their neighbor in the Upper Castle (Horní zámek) was Karl Hermann Frank, the Higher SS and police leader and Minister of State for Bohemia and Moravia.

Following the assassination of her husband in Operation Anthropoid in May–June 1942, Hitler gave Lina the country estate in recognition of his service. It was given the German name of Jungfern-Breschan. Himmler arranged for approximately 30 Jewish forced labourers to work at the estate. According to the post-war testament of survivors, she physically abused them. The Heydrichs' fourth child, a daughter named Marte, was born on 23 July 1942; six weeks after the death of Heydrich. Lina sold the other family properties, including the home in Berlin and the hunting lodge near Nauen in the autumn of 1942.

On 24 October 1943, Heydrich's elder son Klaus died as a result of a traffic accident outside Jungfern-Breschan. On that day, he and his brother were cycling around the estate's grounds. On seeing the driveway gates were open, Klaus rode out into the road where he was struck by a small truck. Klaus died from his injuries later that afternoon and his body was buried in the garden of the estate. Lina wanted to have the driver and passengers executed, but the investigation acquitted them.

The Heydrich family lived at Jungfern-Breschan until April 1945 when they, along with many other Germans, fled the area before the arrival of the advancing Soviet Red Army. The family made it to Bavaria and then moved back to the island of Fehmarn where they were allowed to live in their house after the British Army moved out that same year.

== Post-war ==
Lina Heydrich was cleared during the denazification proceedings after the war's end. She further won the right to receive a pension as the result of a series of court cases against the West German government in 1956 and 1959. She was entitled to a substantial pension since her husband was a German police general killed in action. The government had previously declined to pay because of Heydrich's role in the Holocaust. In Czechoslovakia, she was tried in absentia and sentenced to life imprisonment, which she evaded.

In 1965, she met Finnish theatre director Mauno Manninen while she was on a holiday trip to Finland. Eventually, they married for the purpose of changing her last name. She ran the Heydrichs' former summer house on Fehmarn as a restaurant and inn until it burned down in February 1969, during welding work within the roofspace that ignited the thatched roof. Manninen died in September 1969.

In 1976, she published a memoir, Leben mit einem Kriegsverbrecher (Life with a War Criminal). Throughout her later years, Lina Heydrich defended the reputation of her first husband until her own death at the age of 74 on 14 August 1985 in Fehmarn. She vehemently denied that her husband was involved in the Holocaust, and tried to redefine the 1942 Wannsee Conference, where the "Endlösung" (final solution) was decided, merely as resettling the Jews in the East:

"One day he [Heydrich] told me that a decision had been made in Hitler's Headquarters, to create a big reservation for the Jews in Russia, which could be developed into a Jewish State. Considering the great advances of the German troops in Russia, everything looked very positive. A resettlement of such a magnitude appeared possible." (translated from the original German)

== Works ==
- Leben mit einem Kriegsverbrecher. Ludwig Verlag. 1976. ISBN 3-7787-1025-7. Reissued with amendments to LH's original text, without the historical commentary included in the first edition, and with an introduction by son Heider Heydrich, under the title Mein Leben mit Reinhard. Druffel & Vowinckel Verlag. 2012. ISBN 978-3-8061-1228-3.

== Sources ==
- Calic, Edouard (1985) [1982]. Reinhard Heydrich: The Chilling Story of the Man Who Masterminded the Nazi Death Camps. New York: Morrow. ISBN 978-0-688-00481-1.
- Deschner, Guenther (1981). Heydrich: The Pursuit of Total Power. Orbis. ISBN 978-0-85-613295-7.
- Gerwarth, Robert (2011). Hitler's Hangman: The Life of Heydrich. New Haven, CT: Yale University Press. ISBN 978-0-300-11575-8.
- Klee, Ernst (2007). Das Kulturlexikon zum Dritten Reich. Wer war was vor und nach 1945 [The Cultural Excyclopedia of the Third Reich. Who was What before and after 1945] (in German). Frankfurt am Main: S. Fischer. ISBN 978-3-10-039326-5.
- Lehrer, Steven (2000). Wannsee House and the Holocaust. Jefferson, NC: McFarland. ISBN 978-0-7864-0792-7.
- McNab, Chris (2009). The SS: 1923–1945. Amber Books. ISBN 978-1-906626-49-5.
- Williams, Max (2001). Reinhard Heydrich: The Biography, Volume 1—Road To War. Church Stretton: Ulric Publishing. ISBN 978-0-9537577-5-6.
