= Fehmarn =

- Town
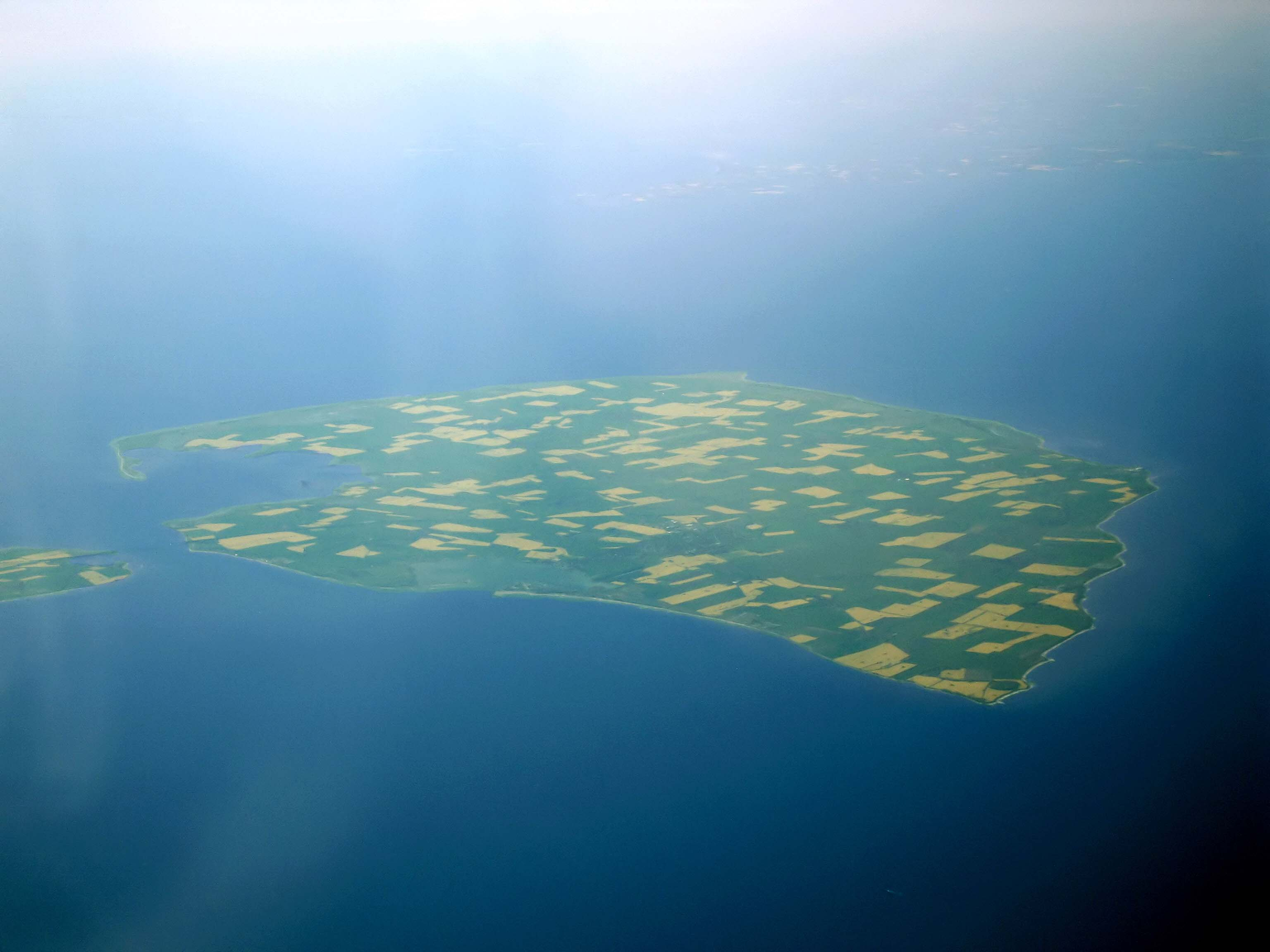
- Aerial view

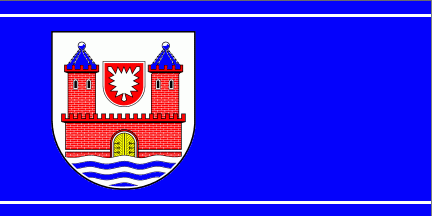
- Flag Coat of arms

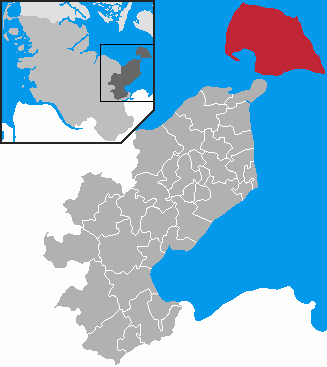
- Location of Fehmarn within Ostholstein district
- Interactive map of Fehmarn
- Location within Germany Location within Schleswig-Holstein
- Coordinates: 54°26′43″N 11°10′13″E
- Country: Germany
- State: Schleswig-Holstein
- District: Ostholstein

Government
  - Mayor: Jörg Weber (SPD)

Area
  - Total: 185.45 km^{2} (71.60 sq mi)
- Elevation: 10 m (33 ft)

Population (2025-12-31)
  - Total: 13,226
  - Density: 71.318/km^{2} (184.71/sq mi)
- Time zone: UTC+01:00 (CET)
  - Summer (DST): UTC+02:00 (CEST)
- Postal codes: 23769
- Dialling codes: 04371 und 04372
- Vehicle registration: OH
- Website: www.stadtfehmarn.de

Fehmarn (German: [ˈfeːmaʁn]; Danish: Femern; from Old Wagrian Slavic "Fe More", meaning "In the Sea") is an island in the Baltic Sea, off the eastern coast of Germany's northernmost state of Schleswig-Holstein. It is Germany's third-largest island, after Rügen and Usedom. Fehmarn is separated from the German peninsula of Wagria in Holstein by the Fehmarn Sound, and from the southern Danish island of Lolland by the Fehmarn Belt. It is connected to the Holsatian mainland by the Fehmarn Sound Bridge. The island belongs to the district of Ostholstein (East Holstein). The closest larger towns on the mainland are Heiligenhafen (Saints’ Harbor) and Oldenburg in Holstein (founded as Starigard). Right opposite Fehmarn, on the tip of the Wagrian Peninsula, is Großenbrode.

The Vogelfluglinie (Danish: Fugleflugtslinjen), an important transport corridor connecting the Danish capital of Copenhagen on the island of Zealand to the second-largest German city of Hamburg via Lübeck, runs across the island. There are currently two tunnels under construction in the region: the Fehmarn Belt Tunnel between Puttgarden on Fehmarn and Rødbyhavn on Lolland, and the Fehmarn Sound Tunnel between Strukkamp (Fehmarn) and Großenbrode (Wagria). The most notable settlements on Fehmarn are Burg auf Fehmarn (Low German: Borg op Fehmarn) and Puttgarden, with the island's ferry port.

Fehmarn is allegorically represented by the "Goldene Krone im blauen Meer" (Golden Crown in the blue Sea), which can be seen on many flags on the island, making reference to the House of Oldenburg, the Danish royal house.

== History ==
"Goldene Krone im blauen Meer" The Golden Crown flag of Fehmarn

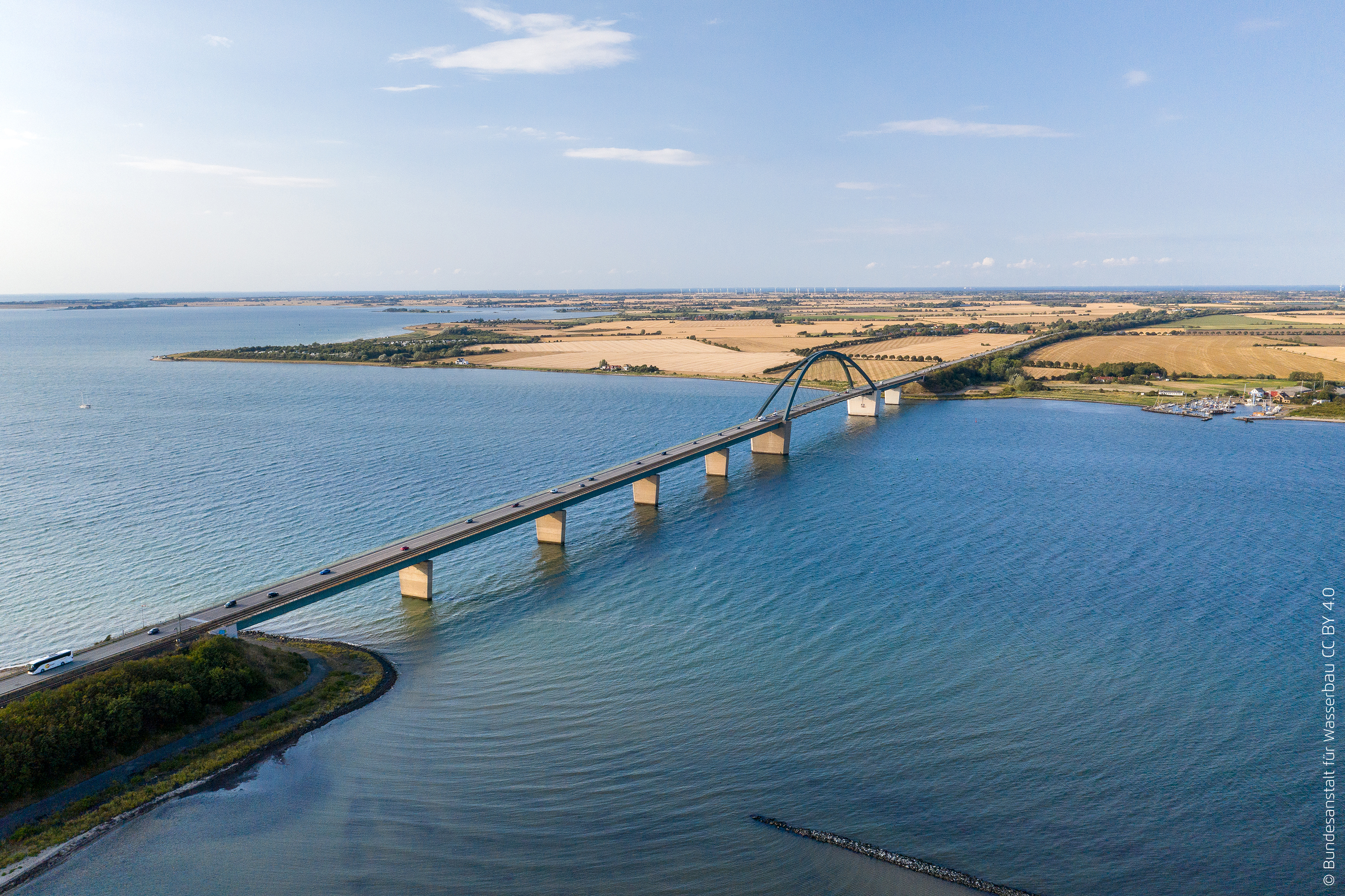
Fehmarn Sound Bridge between Großenbrode and Fehmarn

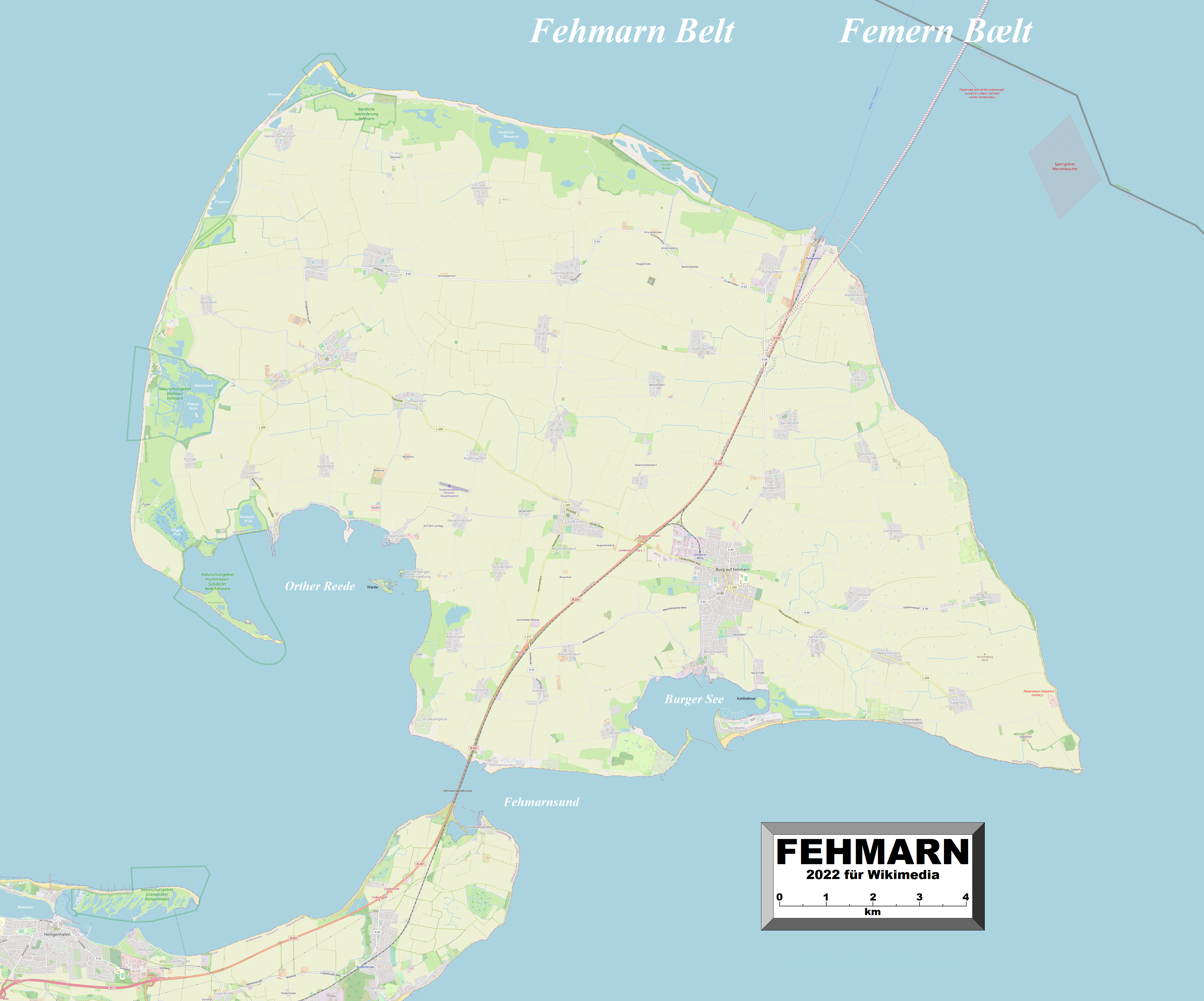
Detailed map of Fehmarn

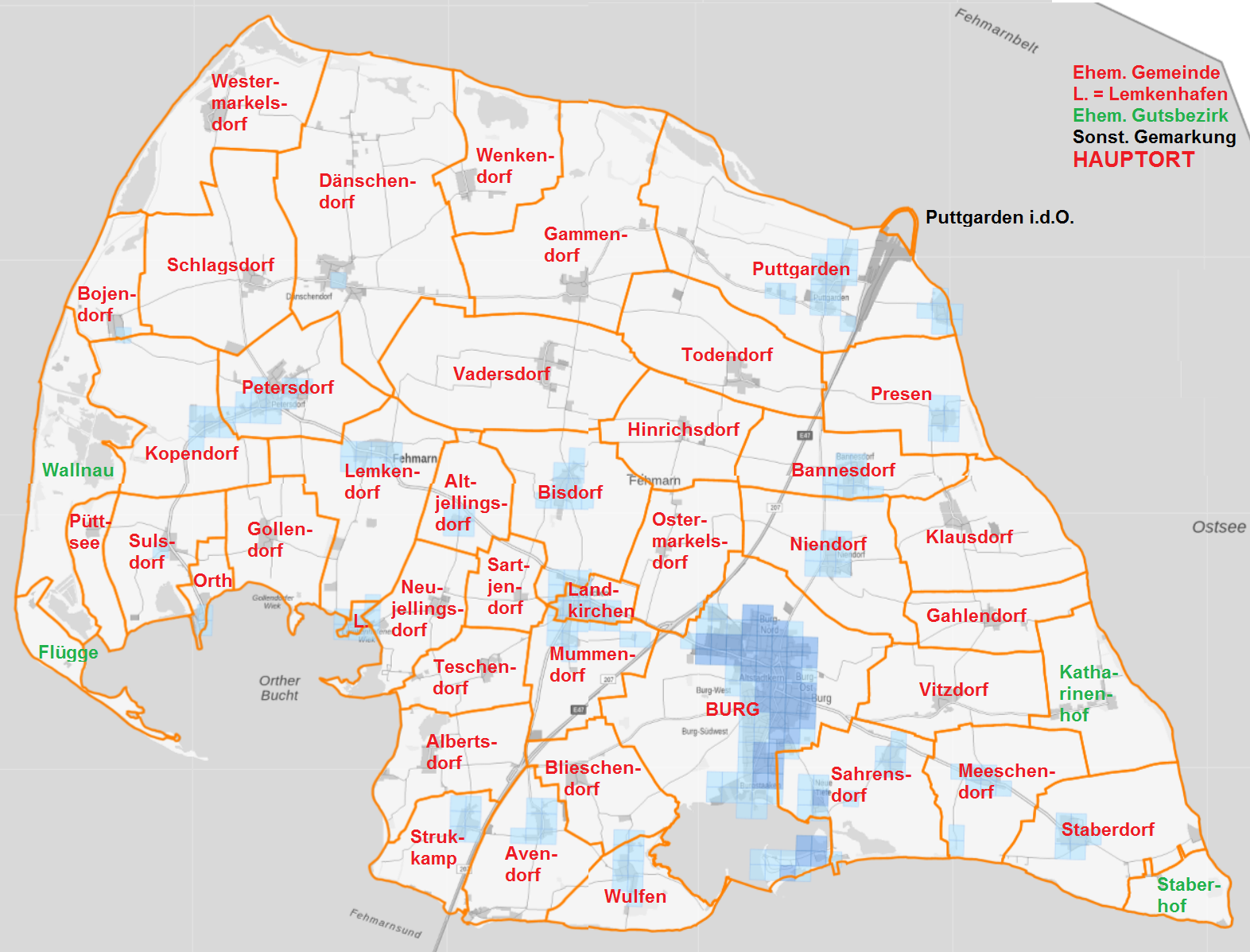
Fehmarn and its villages

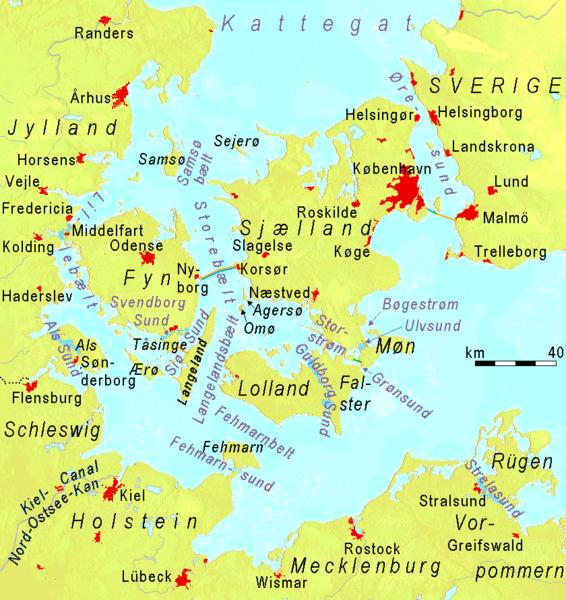
The Danish island world

Earlier names of the island are Femera, Fimbria, Cimbria parva, and Imbra. As a part of Wagria, it was settled by the Slavic Lechitic tribe of Wagri in the Early Middle Ages. Fehmarn is one of the westernmost places of the former contiguous settlement area of the Slavs, and the westernmost island with a former Slavic settlement. The name of the island itself derives from the Polabian fe more (in the sea), modern v more, and has the same etymological background as Pomerania, deriving from po more, at the sea. Puttgarden is also a Slavic name, deriving from pod gard, which means under the castle (on Rügen there is a village with the same etymological background, evolving into the modern form Putgarten).

Other Slavic-founded villages on Fehmarn are Bannesdorf, Dänschendorf, Gahlendorf, Gammendorf-Siedendorf, Gollendorf, Hinrichsdorf, Klausdorf, Kopendorf, Lemkendorf, Meeschendorf, Püttsee, Sahrensdorf, Schlagsdorf, Sulsdorf and Vitzdorf. The villages of Bisdorf, Presen and Staberdorf are either Slavic-founded or founded by Germanic colonists from Holstein, Dithmarschen, Frisia, Lower Saxony and Denmark, who settled the island from around 1200 onwards. The Slavs inhabiting the island were gradually Christianized and Germanized.

From the Middle Ages till 1864 Fehmarn formed part of the Danish Duchy of Schleswig. When the duchy was partitioned in 1544, it formed part of the duchy of John the Elder. Upon his death without heirs in 1580, Fehmarn became part of the Duchy of Schleswig-Holstein-Gottorp. In 1644, during the Torstenson War, the island was invaded by Swedish forces. After the Great Northern War, Fehmarn, along with the rest of Schleswig was united with the Danish crown. In 1864, Schleswig passed to Prussia as a result of the Second Schleswig War.

On 26 July 1932, the German Navy's training ship Niobe sank off the island during a sudden squall, with the loss of 69 lives. At Gammendorfer Strand on Fehmarn, within view of the site of the sinking, the Niobe-Denkmal monument was erected.

Since 1963, Fehmarn has been connected to the German mainland by a road and rail bridge crossing the Fehmarn Sound Bridge. It is 963.40 m (3160.76 ft.) long and 69 m high. In the future, it will be connected to the Danish island of Lolland by the Fehmarnbelt Tunnel; this connection will form a series of fixed links from the European mainland to Scandinavia through Fehmarn, Lolland, Falster, and Zealand.

== Geography ==
The area is 185 km^{2} and the coastline is 78 km. The highest hills are the "Hinrichsberg" (27.2 m) and the "Wulfener Berg" (26.5 m). The largest community on Fehmarn is Burg (German pronunciation) (lit. "the Town of Fehmarn"), with 6,000 inhabitants. In addition, there are many small villages, including Vadersdorf.

== Climate ==
Climate data for Fehmarn (1991–2020 normals)
Month	Jan	Feb	Mar	Apr	May	Jun	Jul	Aug	Sep	Oct	Nov	Dec	Year
Mean daily maximum °C (°F)	3.7 (38.7)	4.0 (39.2)	6.4 (43.5)	10.9 (51.6)	15.3 (59.5)	18.7 (65.7)	21.0 (69.8)	21.3 (70.3)	17.8 (64.0)	13.0 (55.4)	8.2 (46.8)	5.1 (41.2)	12.1 (53.8)
Daily mean °C (°F)	2.1 (35.8)	2.3 (36.1)	4.0 (39.2)	7.6 (45.7)	11.9 (53.4)	15.5 (59.9)	17.9 (64.2)	18.1 (64.6)	15.2 (59.4)	10.9 (51.6)	6.6 (43.9)	3.6 (38.5)	9.7 (49.5)
Mean daily minimum °C (°F)	0.3 (32.5)	0.5 (32.9)	1.8 (35.2)	4.8 (40.6)	8.8 (47.8)	12.4 (54.3)	14.8 (58.6)	15.1 (59.2)	12.6 (54.7)	8.7 (47.7)	4.8 (40.6)	1.9 (35.4)	7.2 (45.0)
Average precipitation mm (inches)	42.1 (1.66)	33.9 (1.33)	32.4 (1.28)	29.1 (1.15)	43.7 (1.72)	54.2 (2.13)	56.3 (2.22)	63.7 (2.51)	45.7 (1.80)	50.6 (1.99)	47.8 (1.88)	43.9 (1.73)	543.7 (21.41)
Average precipitation days (≥ 0.1 mm)	16.6	14.6	13.2	11.2	12.9	12.8	14.5	15.0	13.4	16.9	16.3	16.6	174.0
Average snowy days (≥ 1.0 cm)	6.6	4.7	3.3	0	0	0	0	0	0	0	0.3	2.6	19.9
Average relative humidity (%)	88.5	87.1	85.2	82.4	80.3	79.3	79.4	79.1	79.9	83.1	86.8	88.3	83.6
Mean monthly sunshine hours	43.9	69.5	139.5	212.1	264.3	257.8	261.3	225.6	173.9	113.8	52.2	34.8	1,846.9
Source: NOAA

== Transport ==
The Fehmarn Belt, a strait separating Fehmarn from Lolland, is located on the side opposite the German mainland. It can be crossed by ferries travelling between the seaports of Puttgarden, Germany, and Rødbyhavn, Denmark. The crossing takes about 45 minutes.

On 29 June 2007, the Danish and German authorities gave the go-ahead for the Fehmarn Belt Fixed Link tunnel project, planned for completion in 2028.

The aforementioned 963-metre (3,159 ft) long Fehmarn Sound Bridge connects the German island of Fehmarn with the German mainland near Großenbrode.

== Nature ==
The coasts serve as resting places for migratory birds, and it is thus a popular location for ornithologists. The island's bird reserves are looked after by NABU's conservation centre at the Wallnau Waterbird Reserve. In Burg there is a large aquarium with 40 fish tanks.

Fehmarn is famous for its nature and recreation areas, especially during summertime (July–September) and is also well known for its windsurf and kitesurf spots. Currently there are more than ten surfspots known on the island.

== Culture ==
Scharwenzel is a card game for two teams with two to four players on each team. The game is at least three centuries old and is played today only on Fehmarn.

Fehmarn was the location of Jimi Hendrix's final concert, at the Open Air Love & Peace Festival, on 6 September 1970. The concert was held at Flügge Beach in the southwest. There is a memorial stone there and from 1995 through 2010, the Jimi-Hendrix-Revival-Festival was celebrated annually in September.

The St. Nicholas Church has a baptismal font that dates from 1391.

== Notable residents ==
- Johann Horkel (1769 in Burg auf Fehmarn – 1846), a German physician and botanist.
- Benedikt Niese (1849 in Burg auf Fehmarn – 1910), a German classical scholar.
- Charlotte Niese (1854 in Burg auf Fehmarn – 1935), a German writer, poet and teacher.
- Frederick W. Schumacher (1863–1957), an American philanthropist and businessman.
- Ernst Ludwig Kirchner (1880–1938), a German expressionist painter and printmaker, lived on the island 1908 to 1912–1914.
- Peter Wiepert (1890-1980), builder and writer; born in the village of Bisdorf. The museum on the island is named after him.
- Lina Heydrich (1911–1985), born in the village of Avendorf. Her husband Reinhard Heydrich, (1904–1942) was a high-ranking German SS and police official and principal architect of the Holocaust. They had a summer home on the island which she ran as a restaurant after the war, until it burned down in February 1969.
- Jürgen Blin (1943–2022), a boxer, born on the island.

== Gallery ==
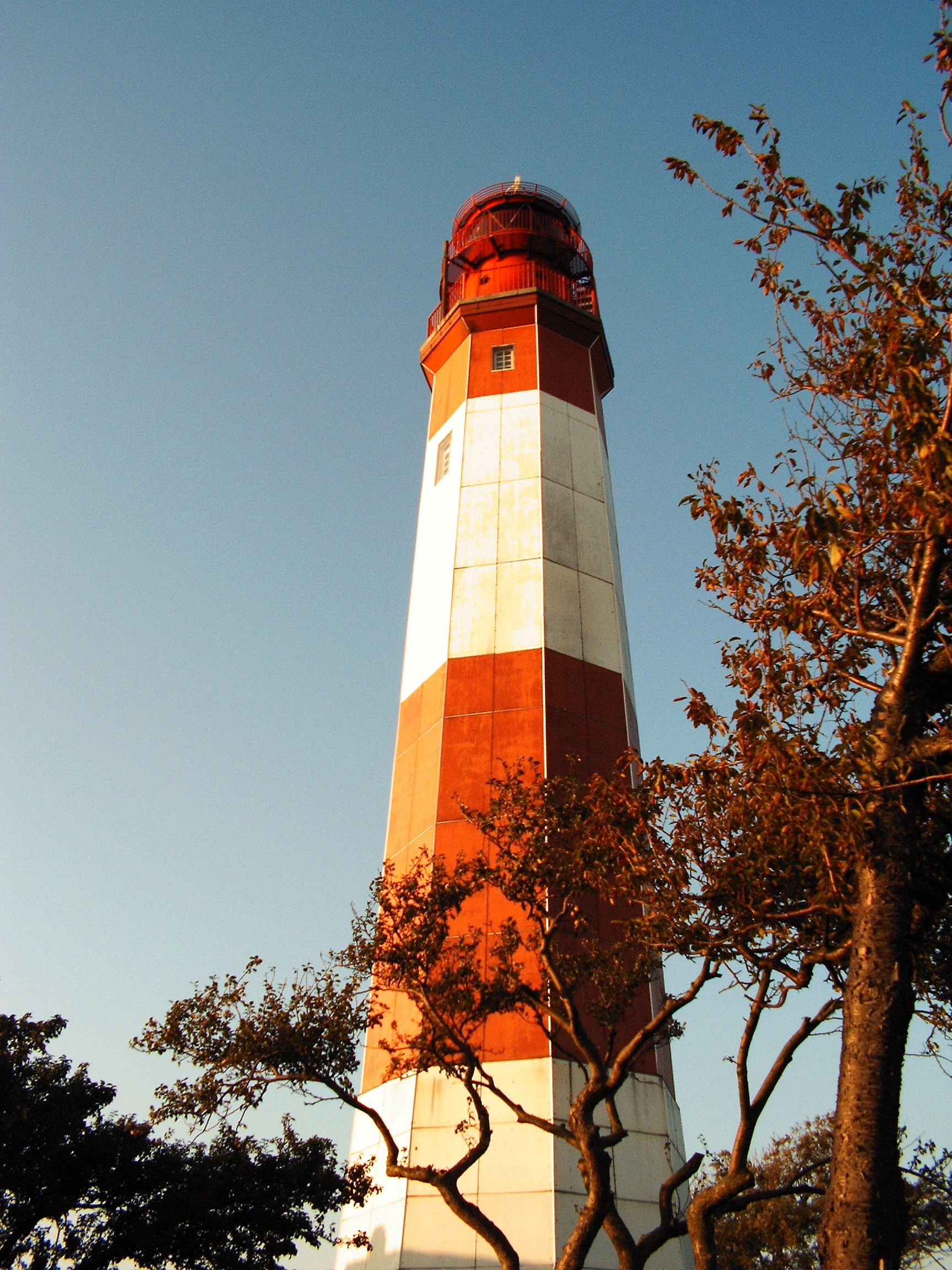
Flügge lighthouse

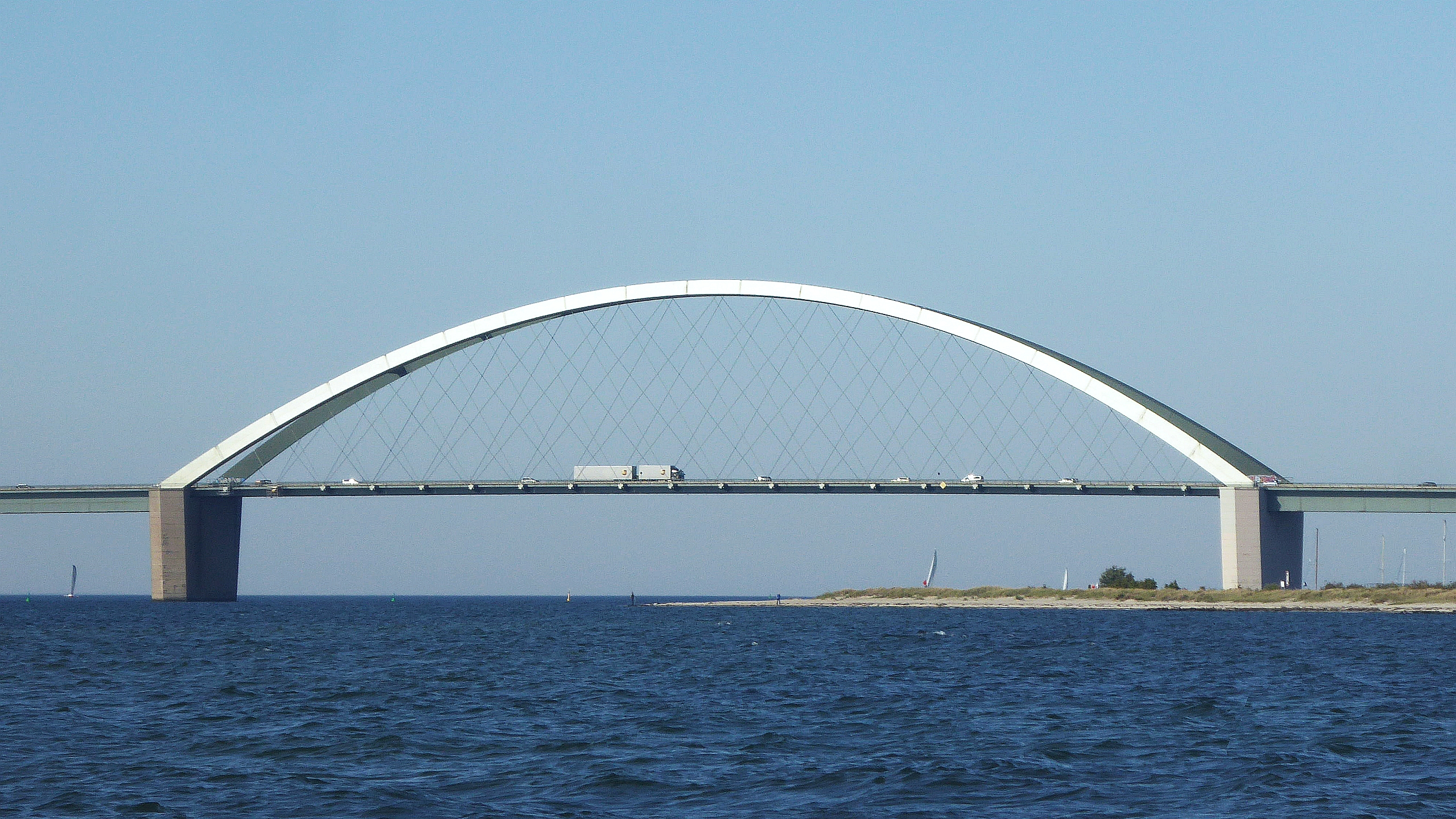
Fehmarn sound bridge – view from east

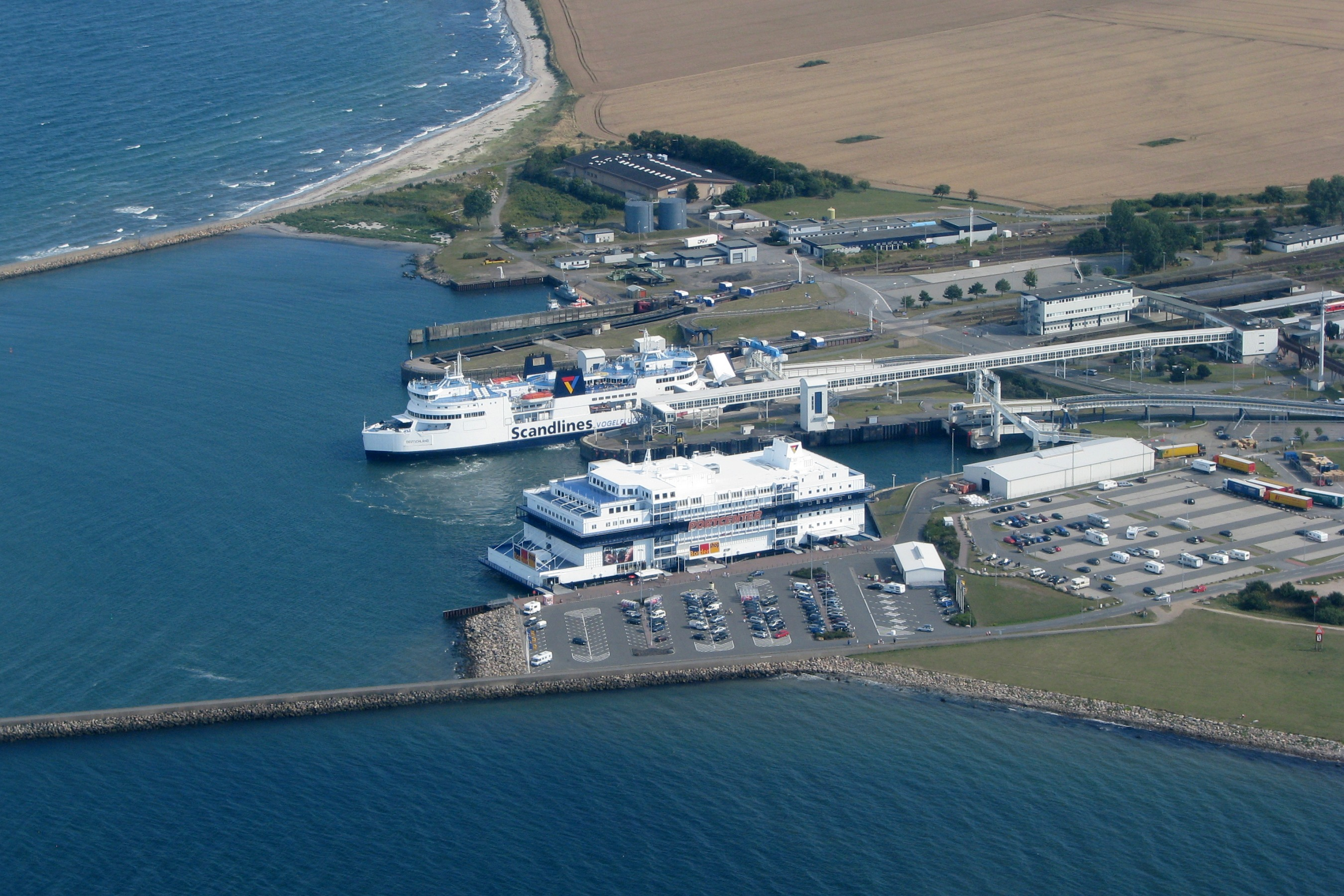
The seaport of Puttgarden

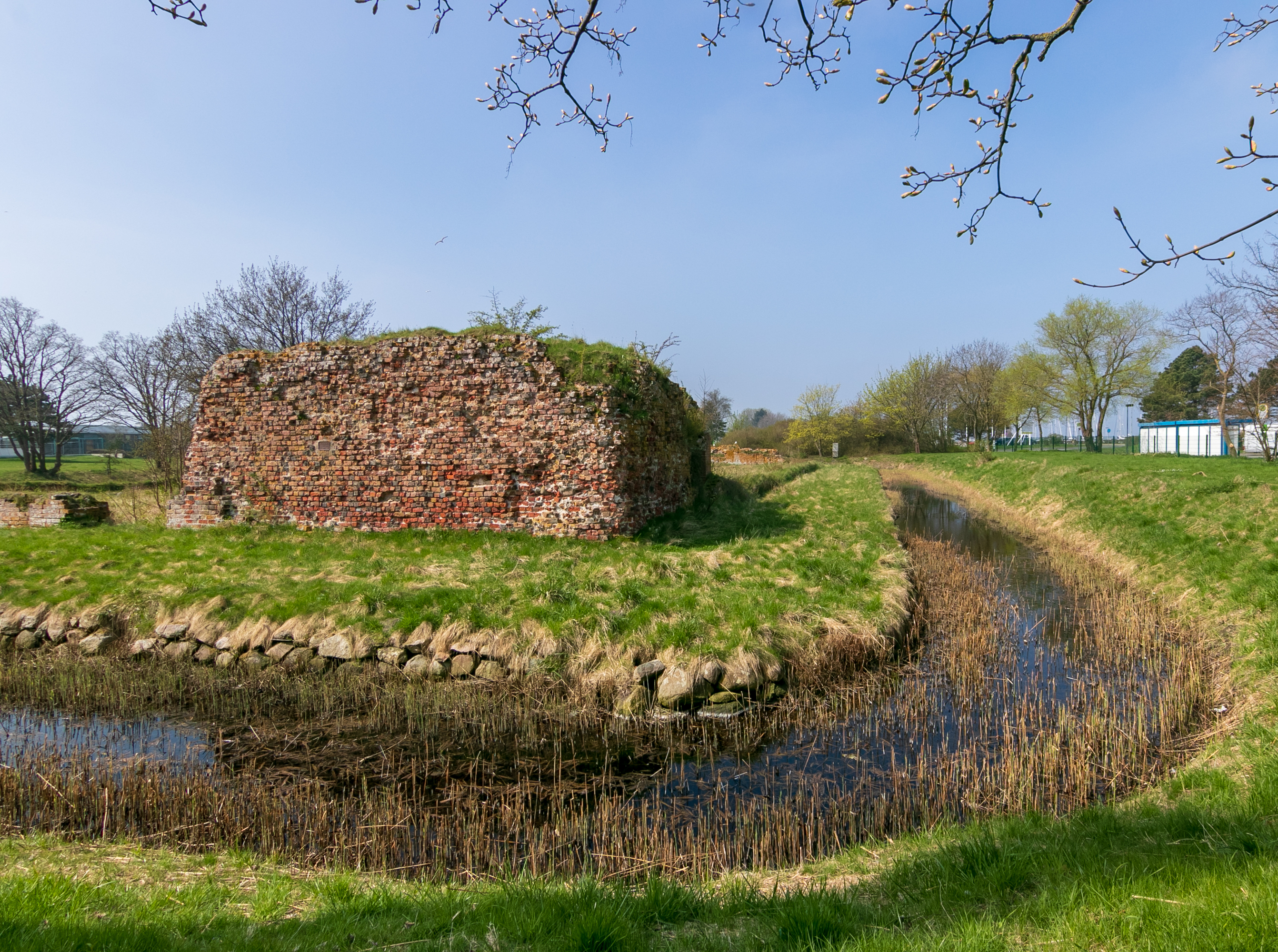
Ruins of the Glambæk castle

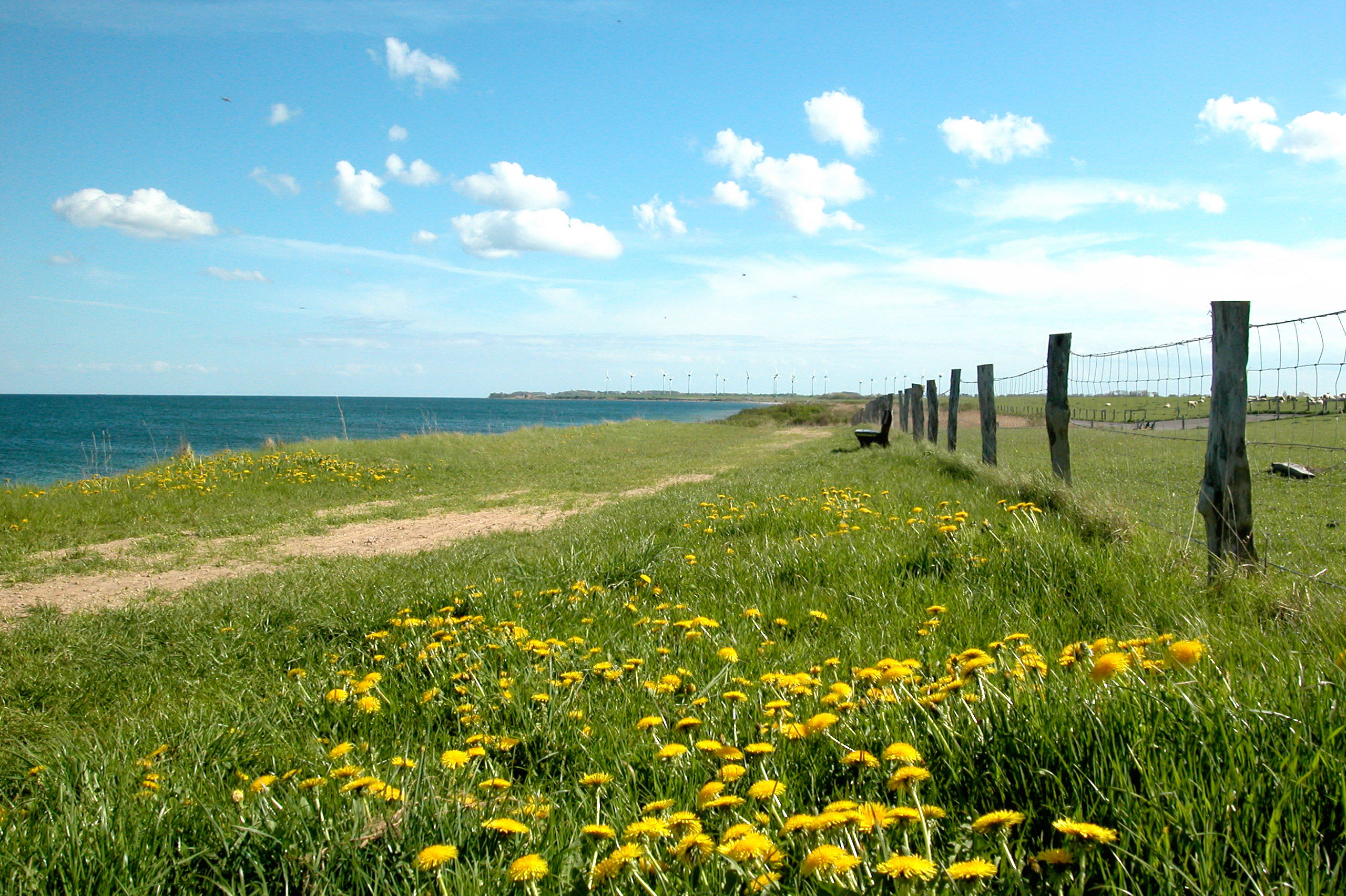

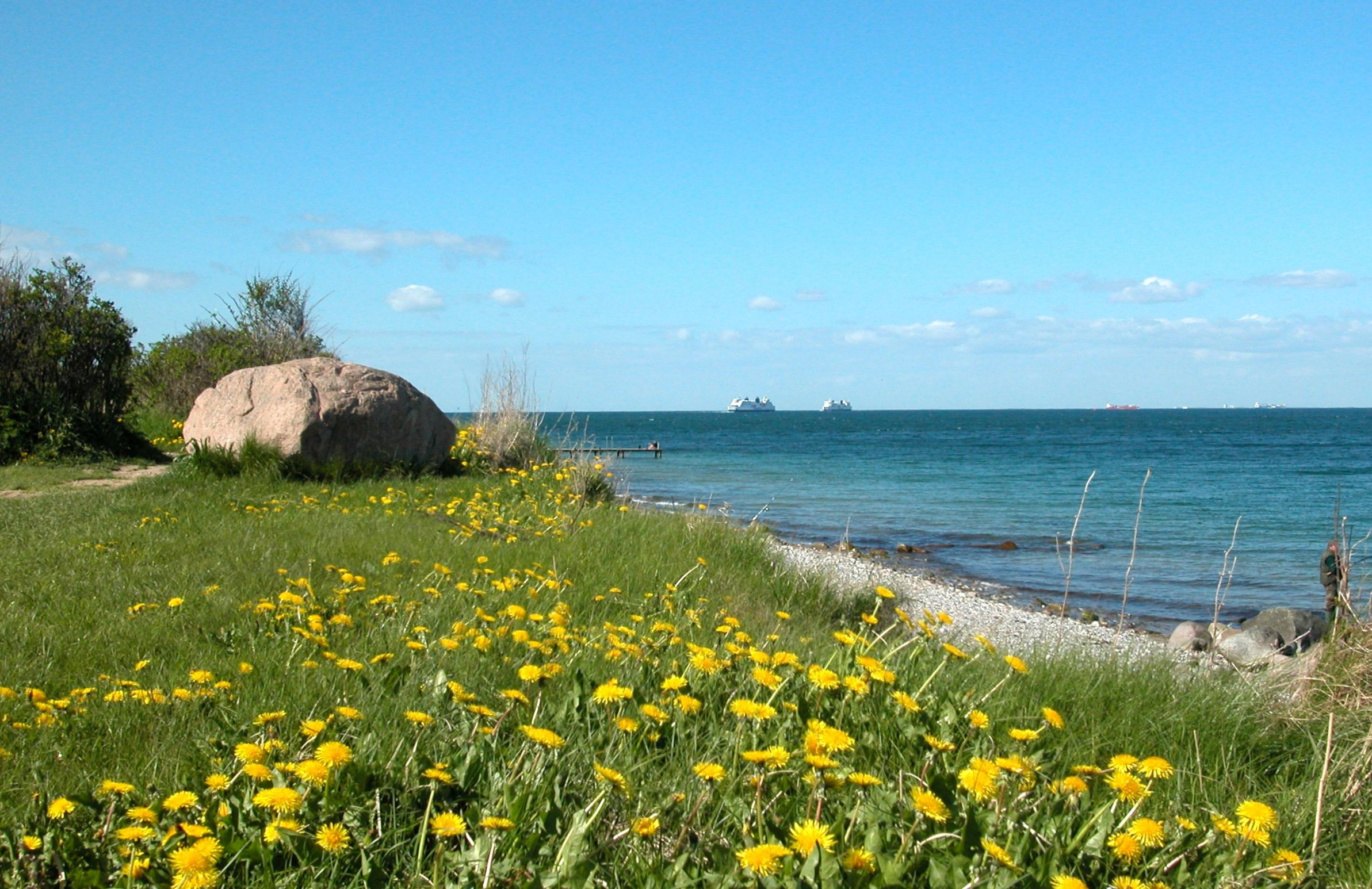

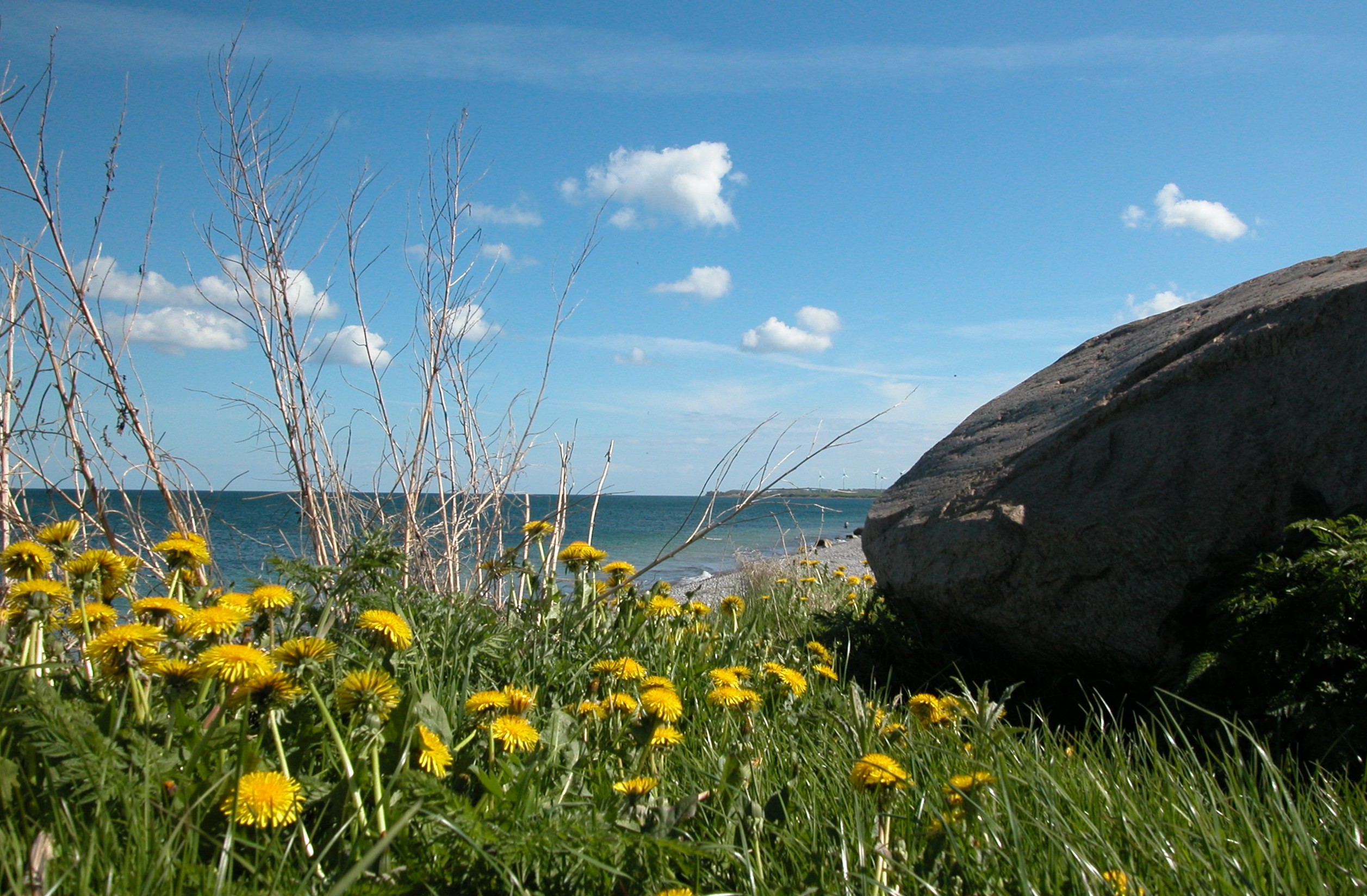

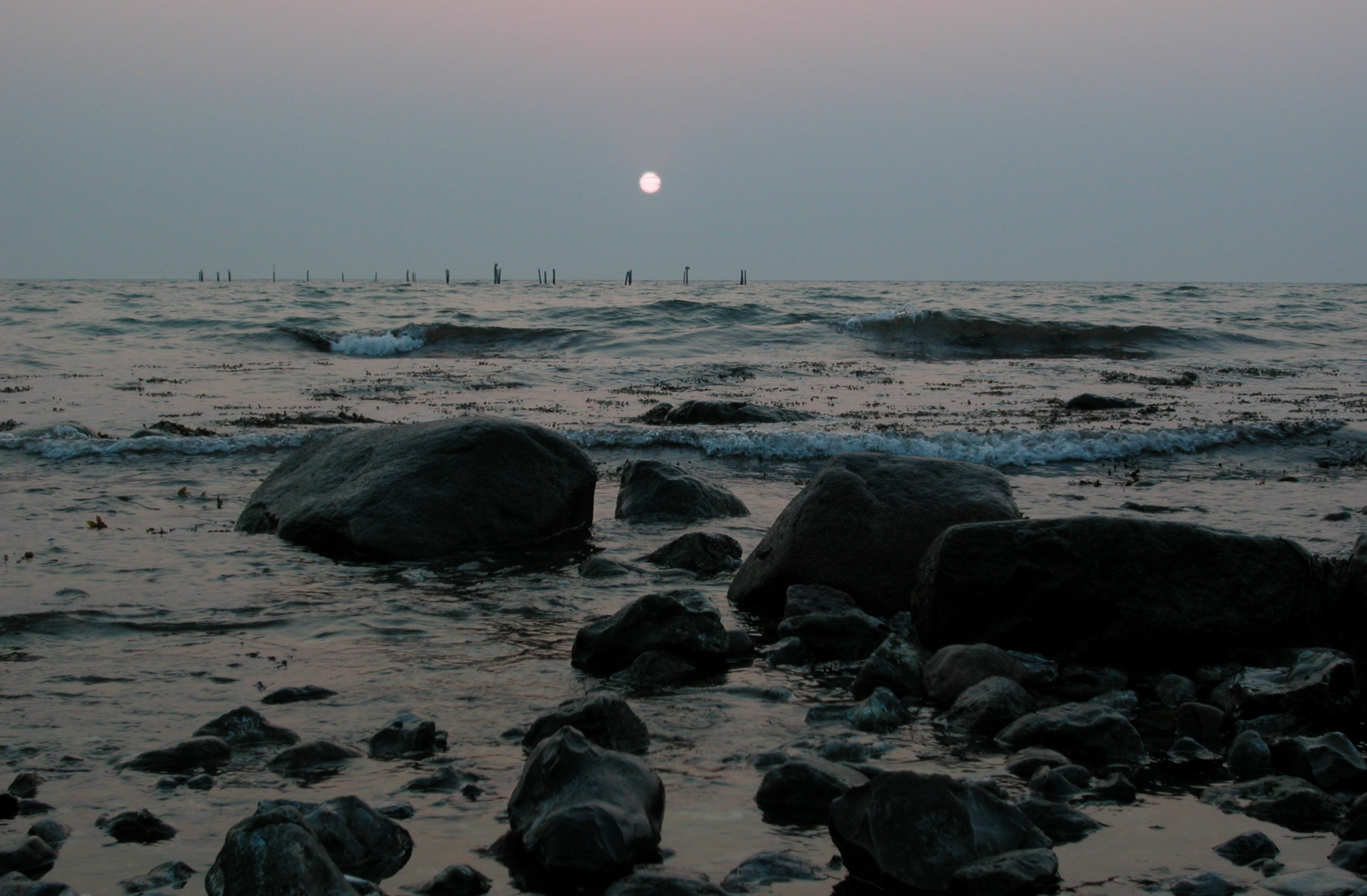

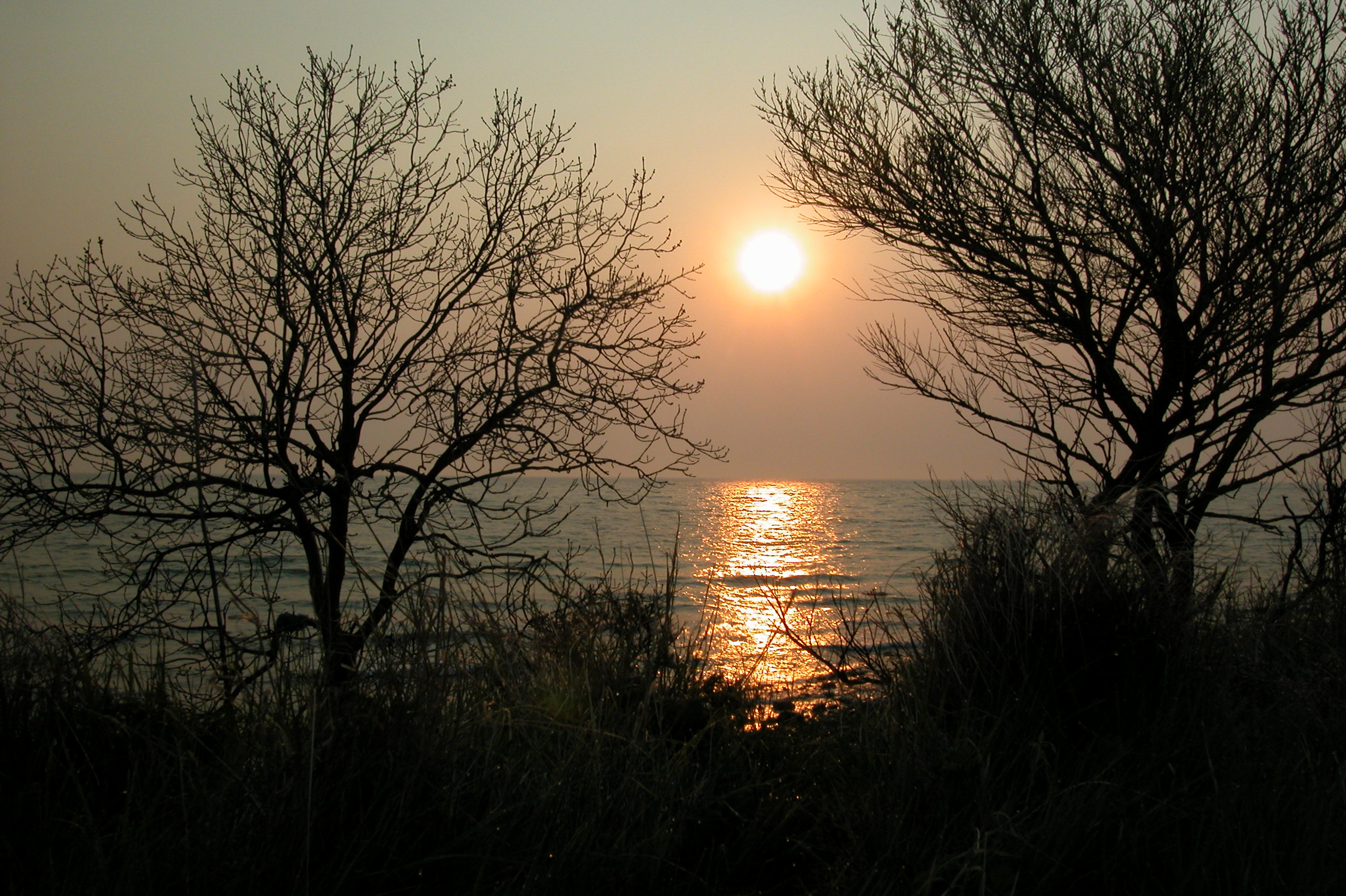

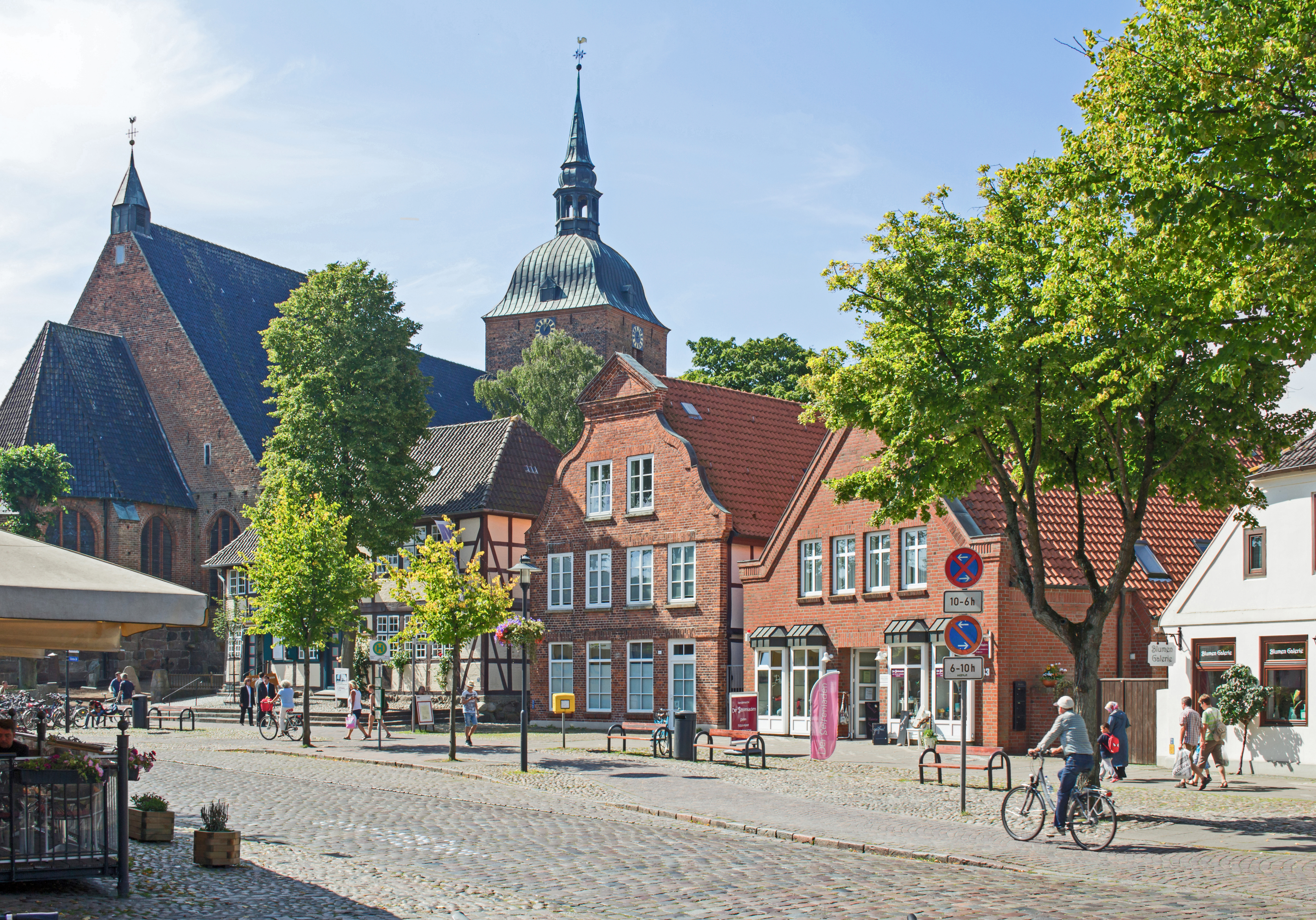

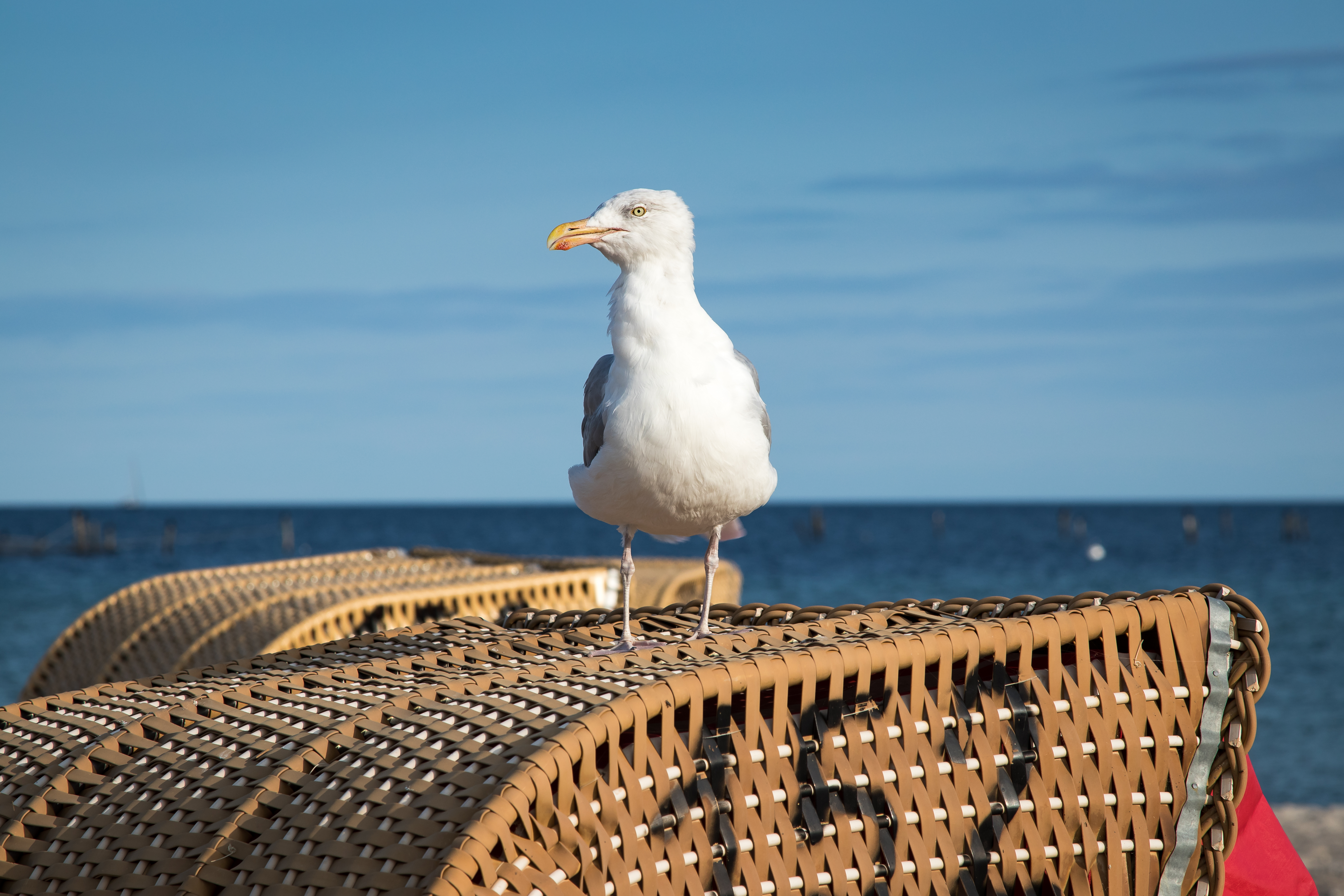

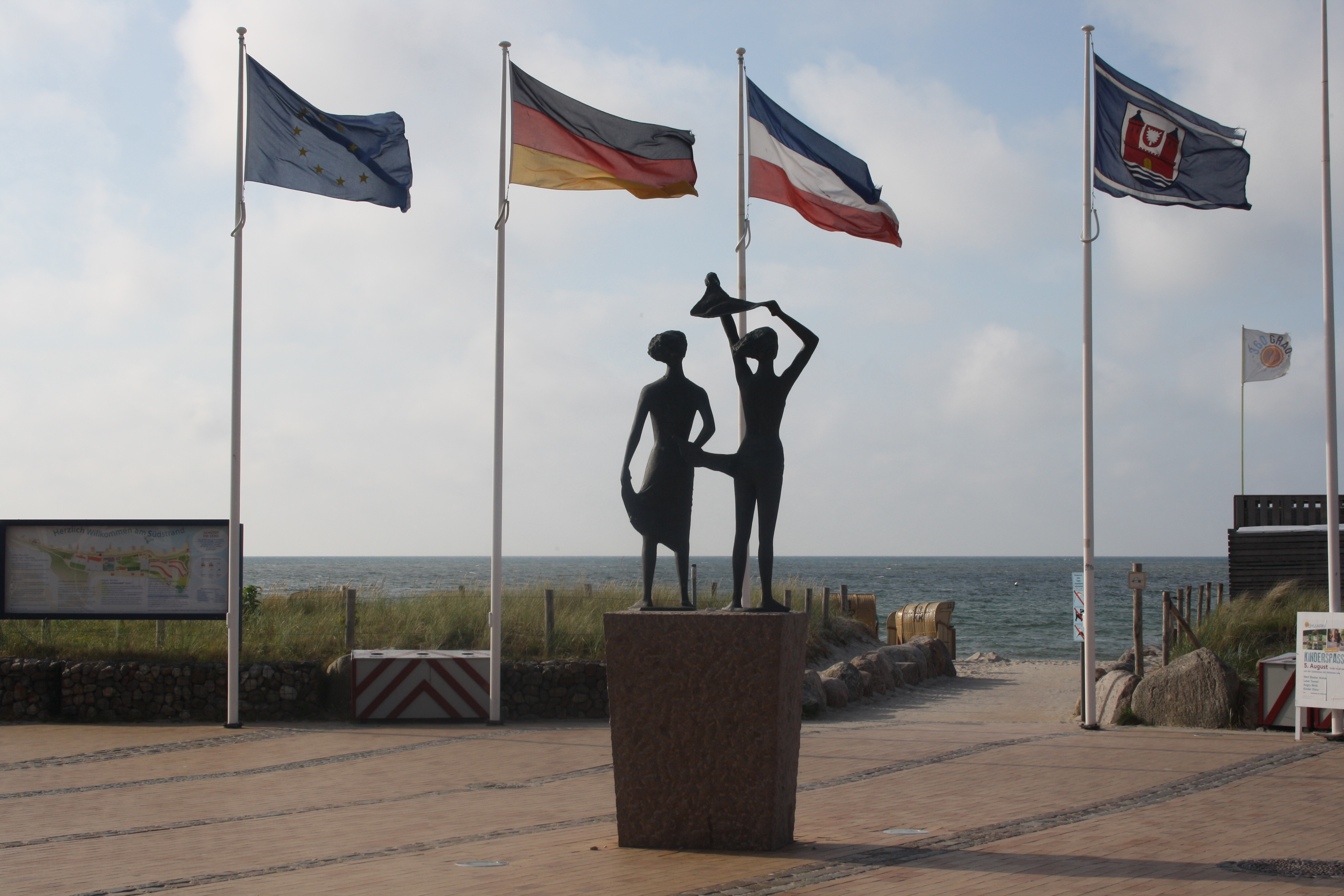

== See also ==
- Fehmarn Belt Fixed Link

== Works cited ==
- Munthe, Arnold [in Swedish] (1905). Klas Fleming, Karl Gustaf Wrangel, Martin Thijsen Anckarhielm, Danska kriget 1643–1645: Omfattande tiden till Juli 1644 [Klas Fleming, Carl Gustaf Wrangel, Martin Thijsen Anckarhielm, the Danish war 1643–1645: Covering the period until July 1644] (PDF). Svenska sjöhjältar (in Swedish). Vol. 5:1. Stockholm: P. A. Norstedt & Söners förlag.
