= Panenské Břežany =

- Municipality
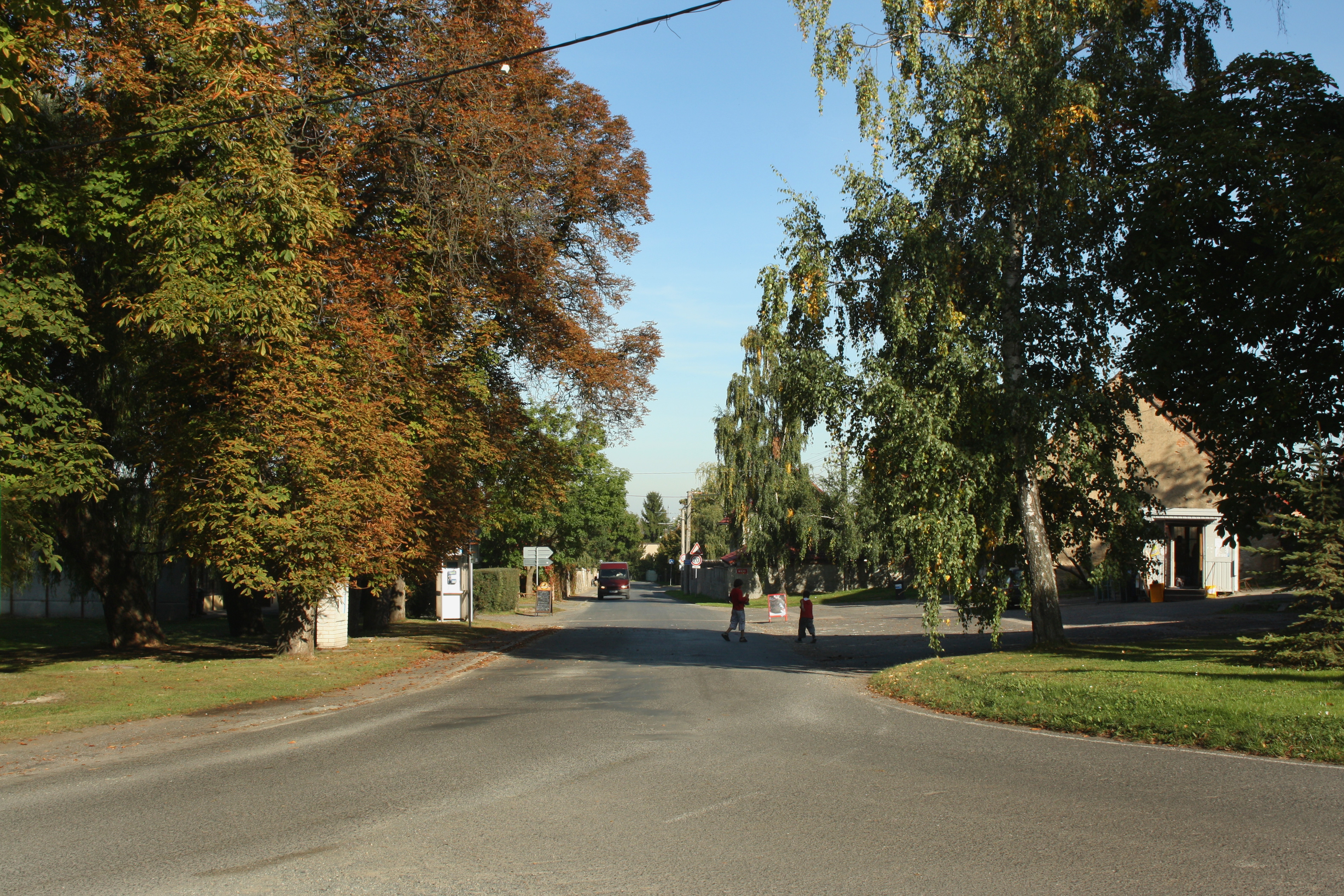
- Centre of Panenské Břežany

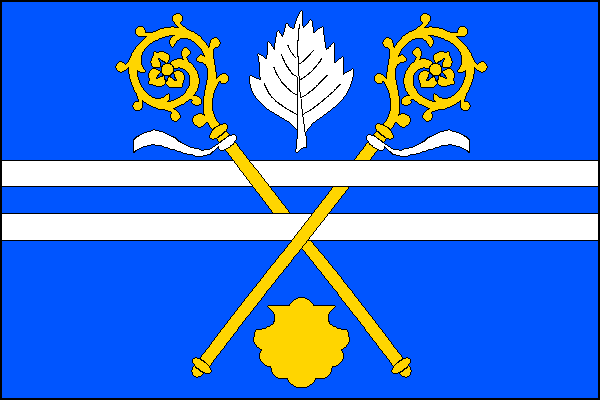
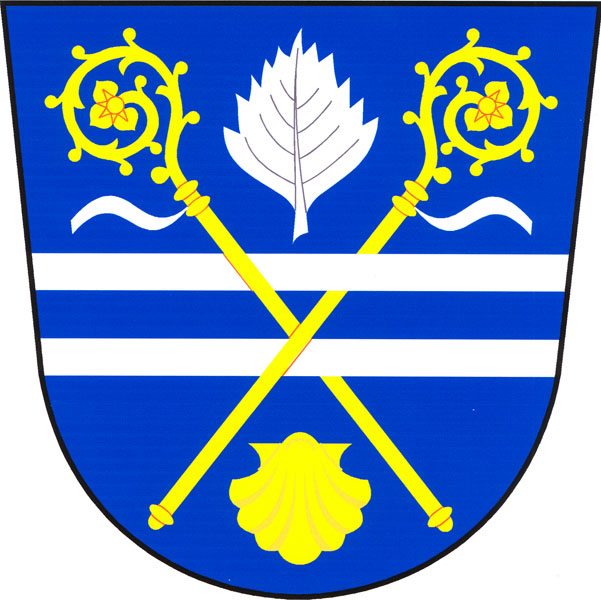
- Flag Coat of arms

- Location in the Czech Republic
- Coordinates: 50°12′50″N 14°26′25″E
- Country: Czech Republic
- Region: Central Bohemian
- District: Prague-East
- First mentioned: 1233

Area
  - Total: 5.79 km^{2} (2.24 sq mi)
- Elevation: 245 m (804 ft)

Population (2026-01-01)
  - Total: 684
  - Density: 118/km^{2} (306/sq mi)
- Time zone: UTC+1 (CET)
  - Summer (DST): UTC+2 (CEST)
- Postal code: 250 70
- Website: www.panenskebrezany.cz

Panenské Břežany (German: Jungfern-Breschan) is a municipality and village in Prague-East District in the Central Bohemian Region of the Czech Republic. It has about 700 inhabitants.

== Etymology ==
The name Břežany is derived either from the word břeh ('bank' in Czech, but in Old Czech also meaning 'hillside') or from the Czech word březí ('birch forest'). The word břežané denoted people who live near a bank, hillside or birch forest, so Břežany was a village of such people. The prefix panenské ("virgin's") referred to the women's convent that owned the village.

== Geography ==
Panenské Břežany is located about 10 kilometres (6 mi) north of Prague. The western part of the municipality lies in the Prague Plateau and the eastern part lies in the Central Elbe Table. The highest point is at 280 m (919 ft) above sea level.

== History ==
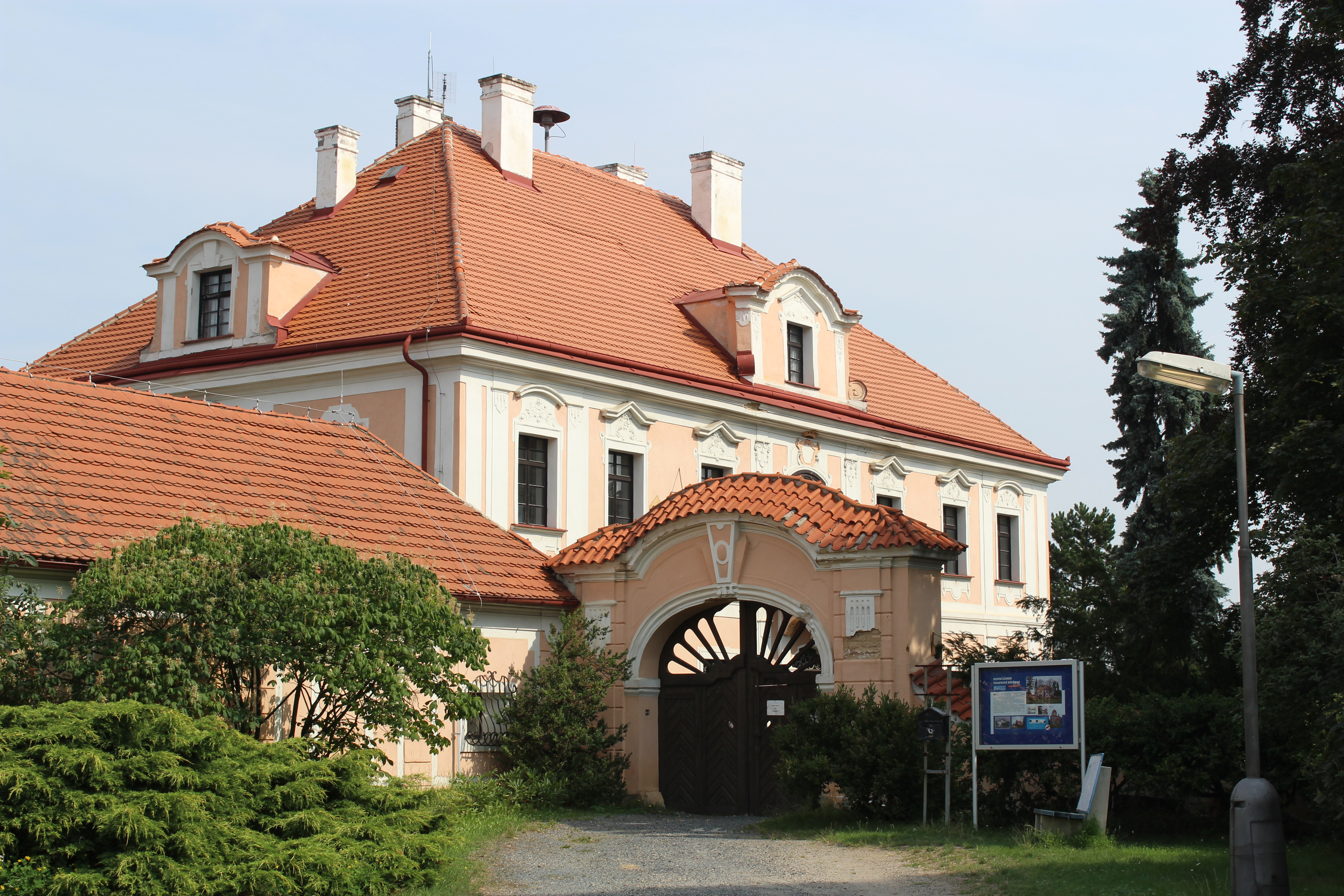
Horní zámek

The settlement was first mentioned in 1233 as the possession of the Benedictine St. George's Convent at Prague Castle. The first mention of a fortress in Panenské Břežany is from 1441. In the first half of the 18th century a Baroque palace was built, which came to be called Horní zámek ('upper castle').

After the secularisation of the monastery during reign of Emperor Joseph II, the estate fell to the Virgin Teinitz Religious foundation. Until 1828, the owners changed several times, then it was purchased by Matthias von Riese-Stallburg. Around 1840, he had built the Dolní zámek ('lower castle'). His descendants lost the property in 1901 because of indebtedness to the Prague Credit Bank. In 1909, the property was bought by Ferdinand Bloch-Bauer, a financially strong Jewish buyer involved in the sugar industry.

Following the Nazi occupation after 1939, the Jewish industrialist fled and the estate was confiscated. From 1939 to 1942 the Dolní zámek was the residence of the Reichsprotektor of Bohemia and Moravia. In the castle complex lived both Konstantin von Neurath and from 1941 his deputy (Stellvertretender Reichsprotektor), the SS-Obergruppenführer Reinhard Heydrich, with their families.

In May 1942, while driving from the mansion to his work in Prague, Heydrich died as a result of an assassination attempt. After Heydrich's death, his widow Lina lived with the children at the castle until 1945. Their ten-year-old son Klaus died in a car accident there in October 1943.

The Horní zámek was occupied by Karl Hermann Frank during World War II.

"In April 1943 Hitler finally decided that the future of the [Heydrich] family must be safeguarded, and by a special Fuehrer-decree he ordered that Heydrich's "beloved schloss Jungfern-Breschan" with all its contents and lands should be handed over to his widow and family in perpetuity. The Fuehrer added that it was his desire that the heirs should always be associated with the property."

== Demographics ==
Historical population

Year	Pop.	±%
1869	556	—
1880	551	−0.9%
1890	553	+0.4%
1900	524	−5.2%
1910	568	+8.4%

Year	Pop.	±%
1921	521	−8.3%
1930	522	+0.2%
1950	466	−10.7%
1961	554	+18.9%
1970	523	−5.6%

Year	Pop.	±%
1980	493	−5.7%
1991	433	−12.2%
2001	498	+15.0%
2011	641	+28.7%
2021	673	+5.0%

Source: Censuses

== Transport ==
The D8 motorway from Prague to Ústí nad Labem runs through the municipality.

== Sights ==
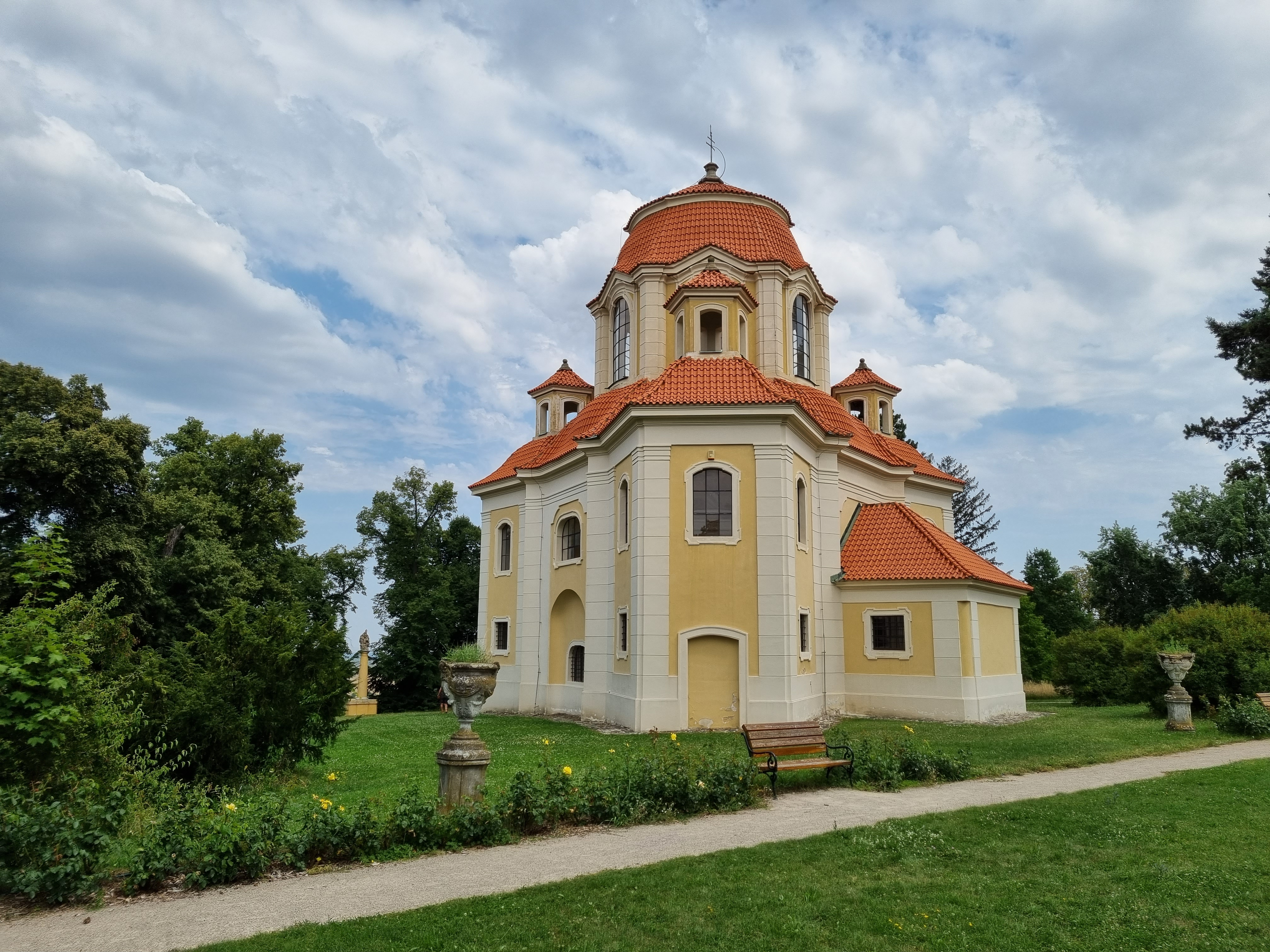
Chapel of Saint Anne

The castle Horní zámek is open to the public. It contains several exhibitions with chapters of Czech history during the Protectorate of Bohemia and Moravia. Next to the castle is the Chapel of Saint Anne. This valuable chapel was built by the architect Jan Santini Aichel.

The castle Dolní zámek is also a landmark of Panenské Břežany. It is a Neoclassical building with a monumental staircase in the Art Deco style. Since 2016, it has been unused and inaccessible to the public.
