= Otto Manninen =

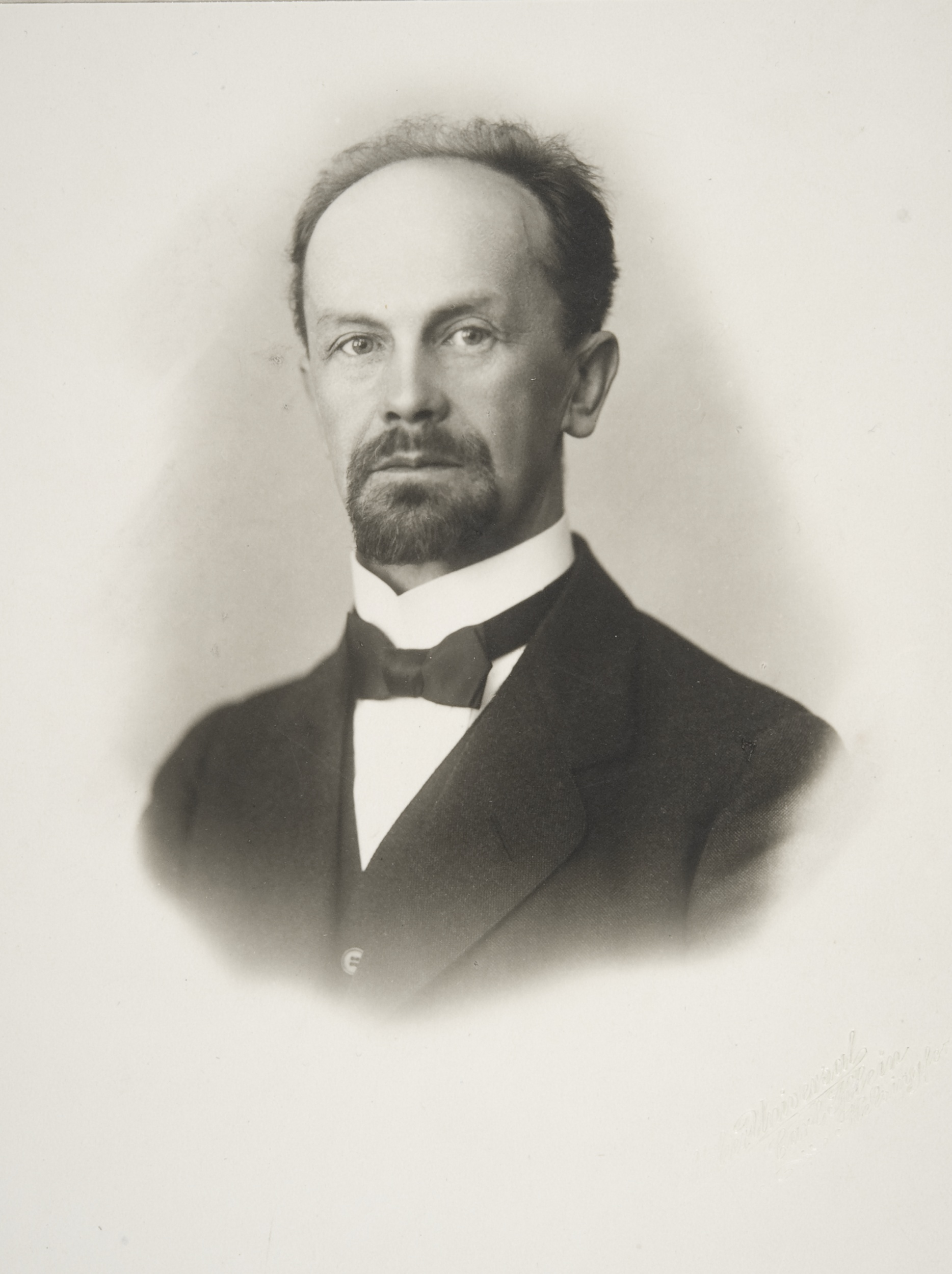
- Born: 13 August 1872; Kangasniemi, Grand Duchy of Finland, Russian Empire
- Died: 6 April 1950 (aged 77); Helsinki, Finland
- Education: Helsinki University
- Spouse: Anni Swan (m. 1907)
- Writing career
- Language: Finnish

Otto Manninen (13 August 1872 – 6 April 1950) was a Finnish writer, poet, and a celebrated translator of world classics into Finnish language. Along with Eino Leino in the early 20th century, he is considered as a pioneer of Finnish poetry. Manninen translated the works of Homer, Sophocles, Euripides, Heine, Ibsen, Petőfi and Runeberg into Finnish.

== Life ==
Manninen was born in Kangasniemi as a farmer's son. He was one of the ten children of Topias and Matilda Manninen. After passing the matriculation examination in 1892, he was admitted into the University of Helsinki, receiving his Bachelor of Arts degree in 1897. From 1898-99 he was an assistant editor of the periodical Valvoja. His early translations of Heinrich Heine were published in Koitar, the student magazine of the university, in 1897. Parts of Heine's Saksanmaa (Deutschland. Ein Wintermärchen) were published in Valvoja in 1900 while the complete translation was published in 1904.

From 1907–1909 Manninen worked for the Finnish National Theatre. In 1913 he became a teacher of Finnish language at the University of Helsinki, where he remained until 1937. Manninen was a member of editorial staff of several non-fiction books, including an encyclopedia named Tietosanakirja (1909–21), and the chairperson of the National Council for Literature for nearly fifteen years. During the Civil War (1918), Manninen supported the legal government and was a member of the Civil Guards.

On 10 February 1907, Manninen married Anni Swan, a noted author of fairy tales and children's books. They had three sons, Antero (1907–2000), Sulevi (1909–36), and Mauno (1915–1969). From the 1910s on, the Manninen family spent their summers on the island of Kotavuori in Puulavesi, where they built a house. In the serene environment of Kotavuori, Manninen spent most of his time writing poems and completing his translations.

In 1939, he received the Hungarian PEN Club medal. Manninen died in Helsinki on 6 April 1950 after a short period of illness. In 1954, his statue by the sculptor Wäinö Aaltonen was installed in Mikkeli.

== Literary works ==
Manninen's first anthology of poems Säkeitä I was published in 1905. A number of poems from this collection had already appeared in other anthologies. In this work, Manninen used his huge vocabulary of old written language, to archaisms and his own neologisms, which went unnoticed. The reviews considered it difficult due to its compressed expression.

Manninen published his works at long intervals. In 1910, his second collection of poems, Säkeitä II was published. Again, it took another 15 years to finish his next work, Virrantyven (1925). Virrantyven mostly consists of the poems written on various anniversaries, translations, and patriotic poems written in the aftermath of the Civil War of 1918.

Manninen's last collection of poems during his lifetime, Matkamies, was published in 1938. It included several poems, such as Nyt (now) and Kaukainen tie (distant road), which dealt with the loss of his son Sulevi. In these poems, Manninen described him as a guiding star, helping his father to accept his own fate. An anthology of his poems, Muistojen tie, was published posthumously from the poet's literary estate in 1951.

Manninen translated a number of world classics into Finnish, including Sophocles's Oedipus Rex (1937), Euripides's Medeia (1949), Homer's Iliad (1919) and Odyssey (1924) and Goethe's Faust (second part 1934, first part 1936) and Hermann and Dorothea (1929). In his translations, Manninen tried to be faithful to the original.

He translated a number of works of the Swedish-speaking national poet of Finland, Johan Ludvig Runeberg. He along with Juhani Aho, Paavo Cajander, Arvi Jännes, Eino Leino and Alpo Noponen translated Runeberg's Fänrik Ståls sägner (Vänrikki Stoolin tarinat in Finnish) in 1909. He translated also Runebarg's Hanna (1940), Kung Fjalar (1944) and Nadeschda (1948).
