= Heydrich (surname) =

Heydrich is a German surname. Notable people with the surname include:

- Reinhard Heydrich (1904–1942), high-ranking German Nazi official during World War II and a major perpetrator of the Holocaust
  - Heinz Heydrich (1905–1944), younger brother of Reinhard Heydrich
  - Lina Heydrich (1911–1985), wife of Reinhard Heydrich
  - Richard Bruno Heydrich (1865–1938), German opera singer and composer, father of Reinhard Heydrich

== See also ==
- Heidrich
- Hydrick
