= Heidrich =

Heidrich is a German surname. Notable people with the surname include:

- Matthias Heidrich (born 1977), German footballer
- Richard Heidrich (1896–1947), German general
- Steffen Heidrich (born 1967), German footballer
- Theodore Heidrich (1930–2010), American politician
- Wolfgang Heidrich (born 1968), German-Canadian researcher

== See also ==
- Reinhard Heydrich (1904–1942), high-ranking German Nazi official and Holocaust perpetrator
- Heydrich (surname)
- Hydrick
