= Oliver Wehner =

German politician

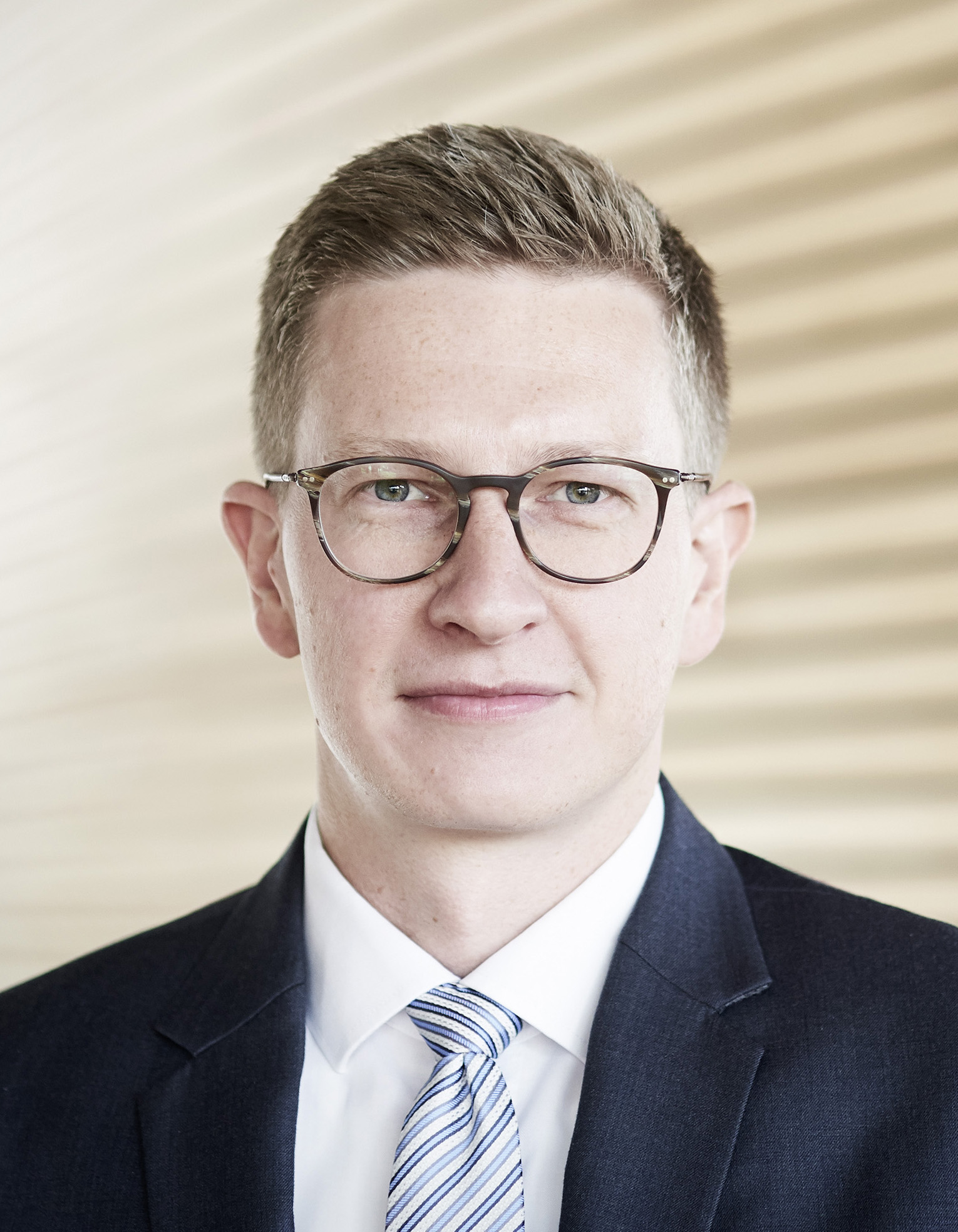

Oliver Wehner (born 7 July 1984 in Pirna) is a German politician (CDU). He is the member of the Saxon State Parliament from 2009.

== Personal life ==
After studying in Johann-Gottfried-Herder high school in Pirna and civilian service in St. John Accident Assistance Wehner finished trading educational program (Chamber of Industry and Commerce) in the German Beamtenkasse, where continued to work afterwards. After that, Oliver successfully studied in the Dresden University of Technology with political science as the main subject and sociology as the subsidiary subject (Bachelor of Arts). At present, Oliver is the chairman of German Red Cross of Pirna and is married to Mira Wakim, a Lebanese pharmacist and former politician.

== Political activities ==
Oliver Wehner is the member of the Young Union and the CDU. From 2006 Oliver has become the member of the managing board and currently is the CDU's Chairman in Pirna. In 2009 he was the main candidate of the Saxony and the Lower Saxony’s Young Union during parliamentary election and won in the electoral district Saxon Switzerland (electoral district 49). In August 2014 Wehner was again elected in the unnamed electoral district Saxon Switzerland - Eastern Ore Mountains 3 (electoral district 50) directly in Landtag. Oliver is the member of welfare/consumer protection committee, the state youth welfare committee and committee of petitions. Also, Wehner has become the representative by the CDU fraction of the Free State in the „Abfall-Missstands-Enquette“ committee as the chairman of the governmental leading coalition.

== Sources ==
- Oliver Wehner: official site
- Oliver Wehner: the Landtag's page
