= Hydrick =

Hydrick is a surname. Notable people with the surname include:

- Daniel E. Hydrick (1860–1921), American judge
- James Hydrick (born 1959), American performer, self-described psychic and convicted felon

== See also ==
- Reinhard Heydrich (1904–1942), high-ranking German Nazi official and Holocaust perpetrator
- Heydrich (surname), a German surname
- Heidrich, a German surname
