= Eugen Krantz =

German pianist and music teacher

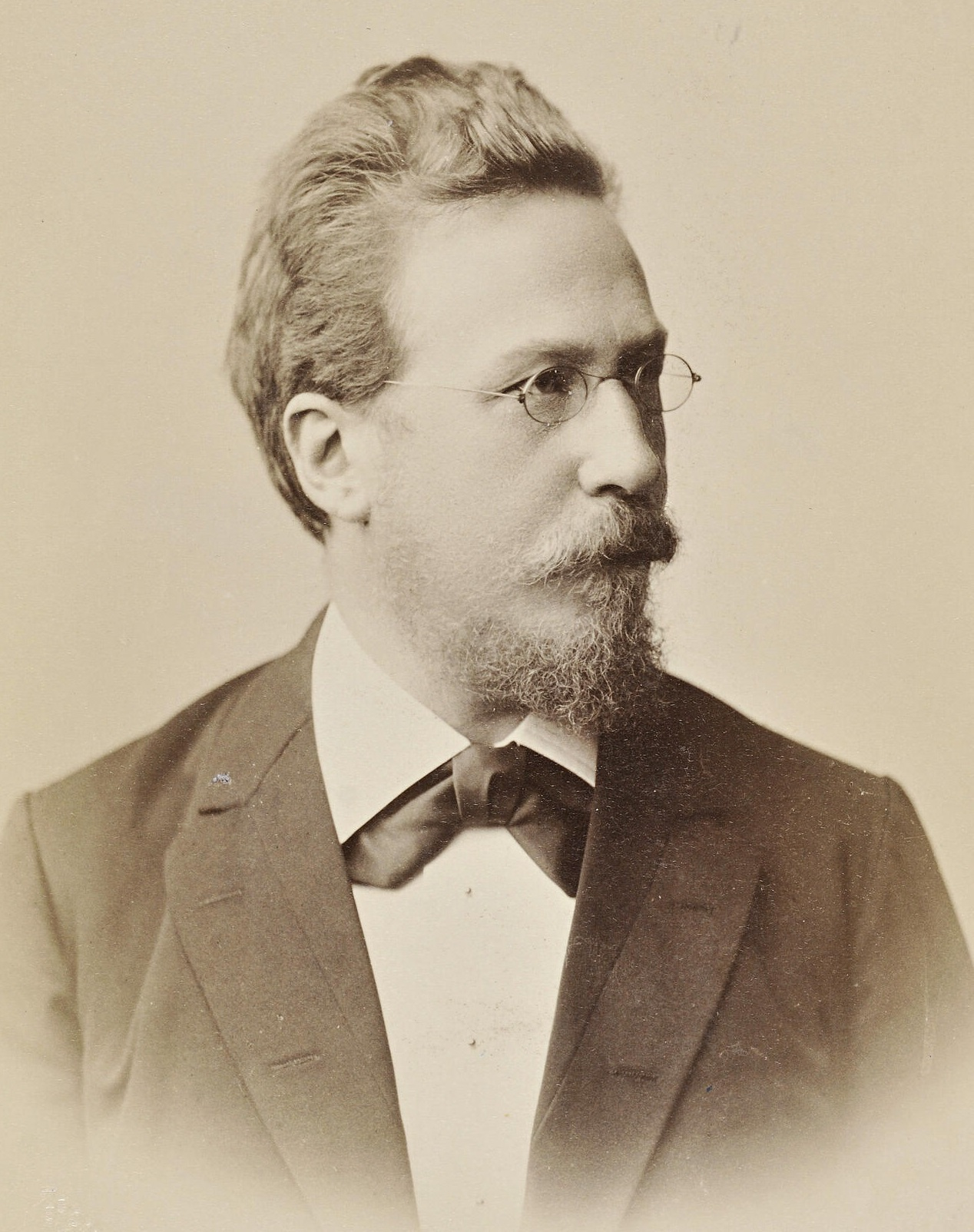
Georg Eugen Krantz around 1880

Georg Eugen Krantz (13 September 1844 – 26 May 1898) was a German pianist and music educator. He was the maternal grandfather of Reinhard Heydrich and Heinz Heydrich.

== Life ==
Born in Dresden, Krantz was the son of the painter Moritz Krantz and Amalia Krantz née Schmidt. He studied at the Hochschule für Musik Carl Maria von Weber in Dresden. In 1865, he took a teaching post in Pomerania, and from 1869 he taught at the Dresden Conservatory.

In the same year, on 17 November 1869, Krantz married the Catholic Marie Antonie Mautsch. Krantz, initially a Protestant, had to convert to the Catholic denomination in order to obtain Marie's father's consent to the marriage.

From 1869 to 1884, he directed the choir of the Semper Opera in Dresden. In 1882, Krantz was appointed a professor.

In 1890, Krantz bought the Dresden conservatory from Heinrich Pudor. From 1896 until his death in 1898 at the age of 53, he simultaneously directed the Dresden Singakademie. His grave is located at the Trinitatisfriedhof.

His daughter Elisabeth (1871-1946) was married to the opera singer, composer and director of the conservatory in Halle, Richard Bruno Heydrich; their son was Reinhard Heydrich.
