= Heinz Heydrich =

SS officer who helped Jews (1905–1944)

- Reinhard Heydrich (left) and Heinz Heydrich
- Born: Heinz Siegfried Heydrich; 29 September 1905; Halle an der Saale, Prussia, German Empire
- Died: 19 November 1944 (aged 39); East Prussia, Nazi Germany
- Spouse: Trude Heydrich (née Werther)
- Children: 5
- Relatives: Richard Bruno Heydrich (father); Elisabeth Anna Maria Amalia Krantz (mother); Reinhard Heydrich (brother)
- Military career
- Allegiance: Nazi Germany
- Branch: SS
- Rank: Obersturmführer
- Commands: editor of Die Panzerfaust
- Conflicts: World War II

Heinz Siegfried Heydrich (29 September 1905 – 19 November 1944) was the son of Richard Bruno Heydrich and the younger brother of SS-Obergruppenführer Reinhard Heydrich. After the death of his brother in June 1942, he helped a number of Jews escape the Holocaust.

== Early life ==
Heinz Siegfried Heydrich was born on 29 September 1905, in Halle an der Saale to composer Richard Bruno Heydrich, a Protestant, and his wife Elisabeth Anna Maria Amalia Krantz, a Catholic. Her father was Eugen Krantz, director of the Dresden Royal Conservatory.

Heydrich's family held social standing and substantial financial means. Their father, Richard Bruno Heydrich, was an opera singer, the founder of a music conservatory in Halle, and a German Nationalist who instilled patriotic ideas in the minds of his three children. The Heydrich household was very strict and the children were frequently disciplined. As a youth, Heydrich engaged his older brother, Reinhard Heydrich, in mock fencing duels.

== Career in the SS ==
Heinz Heydrich was an Obersturmführer (lieutenant), journalist, and publisher of the soldiers' newspaper, Die Panzerfaust. He was at first a fervent admirer of Hitler. Before his brother Reinhard's State funeral in Berlin in June 1942, Heydrich was given a large packet containing his brother's files, released from his strongbox at Gestapo Headquarters, 8 Prinz-Albrecht-Strasse, Berlin. Heinz shut himself away in his room with the papers. The next morning, his wife noticed that her husband had sat up all night burning the documents from the package. Heinz, on leave from the front, could not be engaged in conversation, his wife remembered; he seemed to be elsewhere mentally, and like stone. The files in the package were probably Reinhard Heydrich's personal files, from which Heinz understood for the first time in all its enormity the systematic extermination of the Jews, the so-called Final Solution. Thereafter, Heydrich helped at least two Jews escape by forging identity documents and printing them on Die Panzerfaust presses.

== Suicide ==
When in November 1944 an economic commission headed by a State Attorney investigated the editorial staff of Die Panzerfaust, Heinz Heydrich thought he had been discovered and shot himself in order to protect his family from the Gestapo. In reality, the attorney knew nothing about the forgeries, and was only trying to find out the reason for shortages in paper supplies. According to his nephew Heider, however, Heydrich committed suicide because of a pending court martial case against him for theft and corruption.

Heinz Heydrich is buried in the war cemetery of Riesenburg, according to the Deutsche Dienststelle (WASt).

== Family ==
Heydrich had five children. His oldest, Peter Thomas Heydrich (1931–2000), was a well-known German cabaret singer, and wrote a book about his childhood, father, and uncle. In the book, Peter Heydrich describes how, as a youth, he enjoyed the fame of being a "crown prince", as the nephew of Reinhard Heydrich. During boyhood, he thought of his uncle as a successful sportsman and a sensitive musician. In Prague, Peter observed that his uncle had become a "bigwig". Peter derived many privileges from being Reinhard Heydrich's nephew. Even after the war, Peter still felt some pride in the familial relationship, if not so openly. But finally, Peter Heydrich had to admit that Reinhard Heydrich was a devious schemer, who planned and executed important parts of the Holocaust and other crimes. Peter died on 22 November 2000, after a long illness.

== See also ==
- Albert Göring, Hermann Göring's anti-Nazi younger brother
- List of Germans who resisted Nazism
