= Richard Bruno Heydrich =

German tenor opera singer (1865–1938)

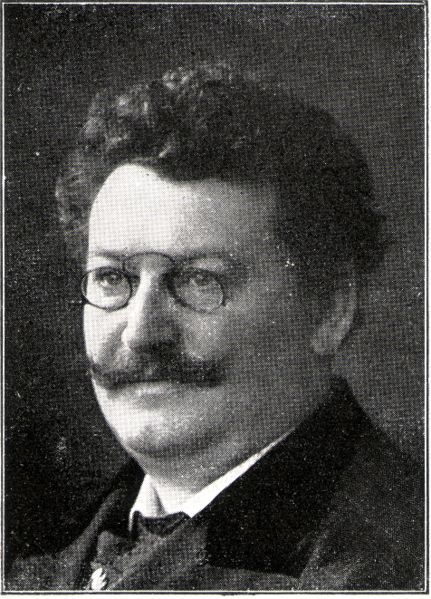
- Heydrich in 1906
- Born: 23 February 1865; Dresden, Kingdom of Saxony
- Died: 24 August 1938 (aged 73); Dresden, Nazi Germany
- Occupations: Musician, music teacher
- Known for: Founded the Halle Conservatory
- Spouse: Elisabeth Anna Amalia Krantz (died 1946)
- Children: 3 including Reinhard Heydrich; Heinz Heydrich

Richard Bruno Heydrich (23 February 1865 – 24 August 1938) was a German opera singer (tenor), composer, and founder of the Halle Conservatory. A talented musician since childhood, Heydrich would find great success as a musical teacher, through the Halle Conservatory, which he ran with his wife, Elisabeth. He was the father of high-ranking Nazi official Reinhard Heydrich, who was the principal architect of the Holocaust.

== Childhood ==
Bruno Heydrich was born in Leuben, a borough of Dresden, into a poor working-class Protestant family. His father, Carl Julius Reinhold Heydrich, was an apprentice cabinetmaker and his mother Ernestine Wilhelmine, took care of the five children. In 1867, when Bruno was two years old, the family moved to Meissen, a manufacturing center in Saxony.

The family struggled with economic hardships throughout the course of Bruno's childhood. This was compounded by the death of Bruno's father in 1874 from tuberculosis, at the age of thirty-seven. This tragedy was shortly followed by the death of the eldest son, Reinhold Otto, of consumption aged just nineteen. Bruno, now the eldest child, began taking on odd jobs along with his mother in order to provide for his younger sisters. Ernestine remarried a few years later in 1877 to Gustav Robert Süss, a young Protestant locksmith, just nine years older than Bruno in order to provide a steady breadwinner for the family.

== Musical career ==
Starting at age twelve, Bruno began to show a talent for music. He played tenor horn, double-bass, tuba, and was first violin for his school's orchestra. By age thirteen he was performing as a soloist with the Meissen Youth Orchestra as a singer in public concerts. This musical ability proved useful as Bruno and his younger brother Richard would often perform at local fairs in order to supplement the family's income. In 1879, he earned a scholarship to the prestigious Royal Conservatory of Dresden, which was run by the Royal Councillor Eugen Krantz. During this time Bruno grew close to Krantz's daughter Elisabeth, however due to his family's poverty, low social standing, and his relative youth he was unable to propose marriage at the time.

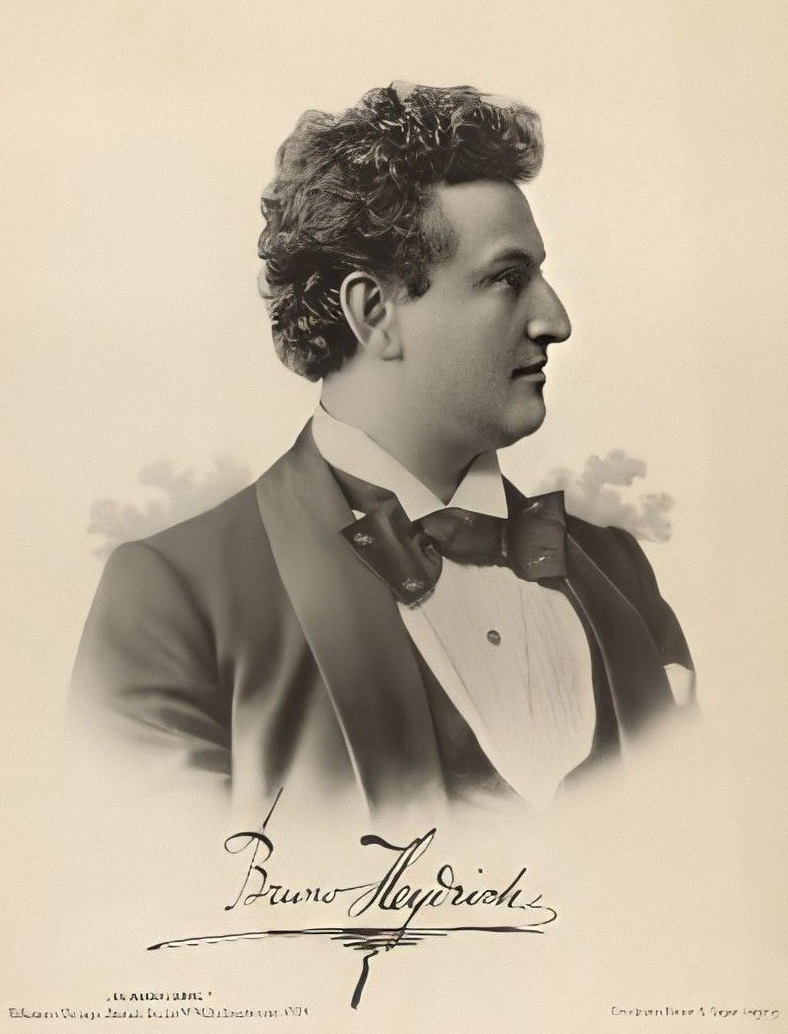
Young Bruno Heydrich as a composer (date unknown)

After graduating with the highest honors from the Conservatory in 1882, Bruno would go onto tour across continental Europe as a professional tenor. In spite of this success, he struggled to maintain a solo career as a tenor as he continued to financially support his mother and younger sisters. During this time, highly influenced by the popular works of Richard Wagner, Bruno began writing several musical compositions. He would release the first of his five operas, Amen, in 1895.

The opera received national recognition and proved to be successful enough that Bruno was able to propose marriage to Elizabeth Krantz. They eventually married in 1887, upon the condition Bruno convert to Elisabeth's Catholic faith.

== Halle Conservatory ==
In 1898, after the passing of Eugene Krantz, using the inheritance left to Elisabeth the couple moved to the city of Halle. Bruno would then found the Halle Choir School in the same year. By 1901, with a growing middle class seeking a musical education for their children, the school grew into the town's first musical conservatory. The non-denominational conservatory took in Protestant, Catholic, and Jewish students, and proved to be so popular they soon expanded to include two buildings on Marienstrasse with eleven teachers, four assistant teachers, and a secretary. The wealth generated by the school and Elisabeth's inheritance afforded the Heydrichs a comfortable upper-middle class life style, to the extent that the family were able to employ two full-time maids and a butler. The family soon became integrated with the upper echelon of Halle society, forming close personal relationships with the officials of the city, such as the Mayor; Bruno even joined the elite Freemason lodge of the Three Sabres, where he would organize concerts.

The conservatory weathered the economic and political turmoil of the First World War. However, in the ensuing years as hyperinflation hit the newly founded Weimar Republic in 1923, much of the family's savings were wiped out. Musical education effectively became a luxury for a great many families. Enrollment dropped to the point where Bruno Heydrich had to beg for a 10,000 Deutchesmark state subsidy from the Halle magistrates. Bruno did not end up receiving the subsidy, and with the increased musical competition from the invention of radios and the gramophones, it left the family in a precarious financial position for the following decade.

== Personal life ==
Bruno married Elizabeth Krantz in 1887, daughter of his former Professor Eugen Krantz, the Royal Councillor of the Royal Conservatory of Dresden. Like his father-in-law, Bruno converted from Protestantism to Catholicism in order to get married. The couple would raise three children in Halle; Reinhard, Heinz, and Maria. In addition to his immediate family, Bruno would continue to financially support his mother Ernestine til her death in 1923.

In Halle an der Saale, Bruno, Elisabeth, and their three children lived in a second floor apartment, Gütchenstraße 20. Bruno Heydrich’s eldest son, Reinhard initially intended to inherit his father's musical school, but went on to become a Nazi official and prominent architect of the Holocaust. His younger son Heinz committed suicide in 1944.

Richard Bruno Heydrich died on 24 August 1938, aged 73, at a spa near Dresden, where his death certificate was issued. His crypt is in the Stadtgottesacker, Halle an der Saale.

=== Politics ===
For the greater part of his early life, Bruno was not known to have been politically active. He espoused loyalties to Kaiser Wilhelm II, having grown up under the German Empire for the majority of his life, but never joined a political party until the Empire fell in 1918. In early 1919 after the founding of the Weimar Republic, Bruno joined the conservative German National People's Party (DNVP) a monarchist and anti-democratic party.

=== Rumored Jewish heritage ===
Rumors of Bruno's supposed Jewish heritage were spread when he was mislabeled as a Jewish composer in Hugo Riemann's 1916 Riemann Musiklexikon, a music encyclopedia. The writers of the encyclopedia mistakenly believed Bruno to be Jewish due to the last name of his stepfather, Robert Gustav Süss, being prevalent among the German Jewish community even though Süss was not his biological father nor of Jewish descent. These rumors increased after Bruno's brother-in-law Hans Krantz married a Hungarian Jew.

Fearing an antisemitic backlash from the large Protestant community of Halle, Bruno would sue to have the next edition of the music encyclopedia corrected. In spite of this the Heydrichs were not noted as being particularity antisemitic, and the family enjoyed cordial relations with their Jewish neighbors. Many Jewish children attended the Halle Conservatory, Bruno rented out the basement of the school to a local Jewish salesman, and his eldest son and future high-ranking Nazi official Reinhard was friends with the son of the local cantor, Abraham Lichtenstein.

== Works ==
=== Chamber music ===
- Klaviertrio, Op. 2
- Streichquartett, Op. 3
- Klavierquintett, Op. 5

=== Lieder ===
- "Abschied: O komm doch mein Mädchen", Lied for voice and piano
- Drei Lieder für eine Singstimme mit Begleitung des Pianoforte, Op. 1 (No. 3: "Das Mädchen spricht: Mond, hast du auch geseh’n")
- "Annemarie", Op. 74, Lied for medium voice and piano (text by Julius Freund)
- "Reiterlied", Op. 75

=== Operas ===
- Amen (1895): opera drama in 1 act with a musical pantomime prelude
- Frieden (1907)
- Zufall (1914) opera in 1 act
- Das Leiermädchen (Volksoper)

=== Orchestral music ===
- Sinfonie D-major, Op. 57

== Sources ==
- Aronson, Shlomo (1984) [1971]. Reinhard Heydrich und die Frühgeschichte von Gestapo und SD (in German). Stuttgart: Deutsche Verlags-Anstalt. ISBN 978-3-421-01569-3.
- Gerwarth, Robert (2011). Hitler's Hangman: The Life of Heydrich. New Haven, Connecticut: Yale University Press. ISBN 978-0-300-11575-8.
- Lehrer, Steven (2000). Wannsee House and the Holocaust. McFarland. ISBN 978-0-7864-0792-7.
- Mason, Daniel Gregory (1917). The Art of Music: A Comprehensive Library of Information for Music Lovers and Musicians. The National Society of Music.
- Wighton, Charles (1962). Heydrich, Hitler's Most Evil Henchman. Odhams Press.
