= Theodore Heidrich =

American politician

Theodore H. Heidrich (December 18, 1930 Bronx, New York – August 12, 2010) was an American politician from Maine. A Republican from Oxford, Maine, Heidrich served for 3 terms (1998–2004) in the Maine House of Representatives. A veteran of the United States Marine Corps during the Korean War, Heidrich saw 11 months of conflict in 1952. During his time in the House of Representatives, Heidrich represented the towns of Oxford, Otisfield, Mechanic Falls and a portion of Hebron.

Heidrich graduated from Lawrence High School before serving in the Marines. When he returned, he went back to Arthur Copeland Dry Cleaners in Cedarhurst, New York. Having worked there since he was 13, he was the owner by the time he was 43. He retired at 55 and moved full time to Oxford.
