= Hans-Dietrich-Genscher-Gymnasium (Halle) =

Hans-Dietrich-Genscher-Gymnasium Halle
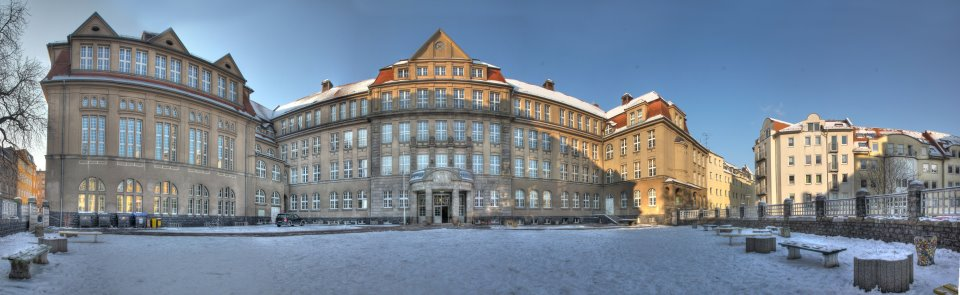
- Panorama view (2012)

Address
- Friessenstrasse 3-4; Halle, Saxony-Anhalt 06112; Germany
- Coordinates: 51.4868°N 11.9809°E

Information
- Type: State gymnasium
- Established: 1908
- Principal: Dr. Eckert
- Grades: 5 - 12
- Enrollment: 619 (2011)
- Schedule: Semester
- Website: www.hdg-gymnasium.de

Hans-Dietrich-Genscher-Gymnasium Halle is a secondary school (gymnasium) in Germany. It was established in November 1908. Currently, about 600 children attend the school. The school is situated right in the city center of Halle an der Saale and is widely known for its two educational profiles: German secondary school and bilingual English-German profile. In 2009 the school celebrated its 100th anniversary. The school is named after Hans-Dietrich Genscher, a German politician.

== History ==
Originally named the Johann-Gottfried-Herder-Gymnasium, in honor of Johann Gottfried Herder the German philosopher, theologian, poet, and literary critic, it began operating in 1909 as a reform school, and graduated its first class in 1917. In 1910 the school moved to a current location on the Friessenstrasse 3–4. In the 1930s the school had become Halle's most populated all-boys school. Seven years later during the Third Reich the school was renamed in "Friedrich-Nietzsche-Schule". After World War II and the beginnings of the GDR the school was renamed again in "Friedrich-Engels Oberschule". Only two years later the "Friedrich-Engels Oberschule" and "Ina-Seidel-Schule" were forced into a union. In 1955 the school name and its profile changed again and the school became the Specialized Children and Youth Sports Schools "Friedrich-Engels". In 1969 the "Dr. Kurt-Fischer-Schule" moved into the building on the Friessenstrasse 3–4. After Germany's reunification in 1990 the school got its original name "Johann-Gottfried-Herder" back. In addition in 1991 the school became a secondary school again, after which it has been called "Johann-Gottfried-Herder-Gymnasium". As a result of communal policy the Tor-Gymnasium Halle and Johann-Gottfried-Herder-Gymnasium Halle formed a new school in 2004. It was decided to uphold the name Johann-Gottfried Herder Gymnasium for the new school. In October 2017 the school was renamed again, after the recently deceased Hans-Dietrich Genscher, a famous alumni of the school

== Today ==
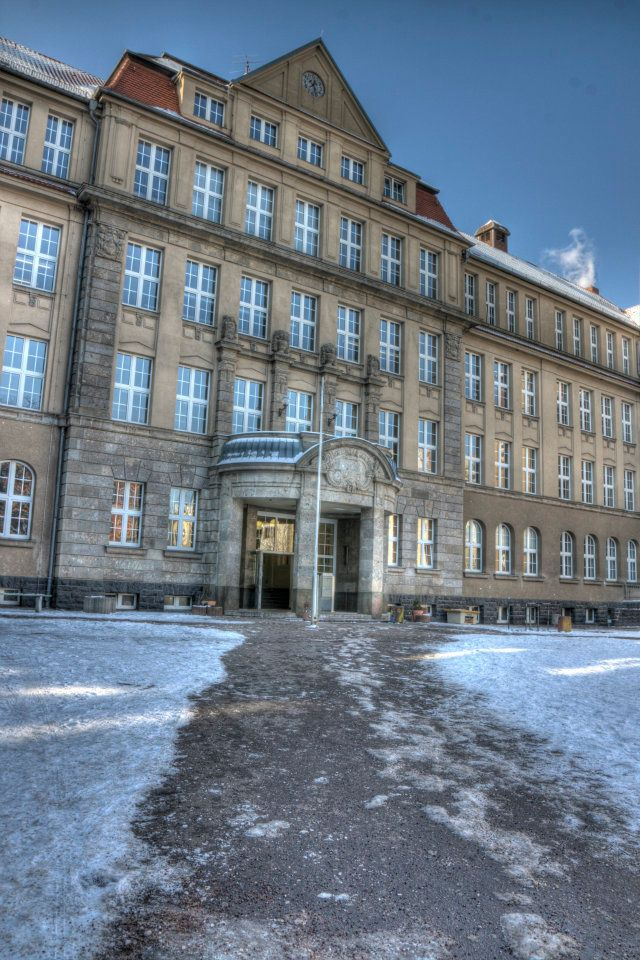
Hans-Dietrich-Genscher-Gymnasium Halle front gate

Hans-Dietrich-Genscher-Gymnasium Halle is a college and career preparatory school that has specialized in modern languages and offers a challenging bilingual program (German - English). Also the school offers its students the possibility of earning the German Abitur. Students study English, German, foreign languages, mathematics, science, history, geography, ethics, religion, information and communications technology, art, music and physical education. A high priority of the Genscher Gymnasium is the acquisition of multiple modern languages and a bilingual education. Recently enrollment in Hans-Dietrich-Genscher-Gymnasium has risen significantly.

In 5th and 6th grade the school offers two additional English lessons per week (in total seven hours per week). In 7th grade students in bilingual classes get to choose between History or every second year Biology as a subject which is then taught in English. Also in 7th grade students choose a second foreign language (Options are Russian or French). In 9th grade Social Studies is taught in English as well. Additionally, students get to choose an optional third foreign language (Options are Latin or Italian). Furthermore, a well-equipped German/English library provides students with great study opportunities. In addition, two computer rooms are available for an e-learning based didactic.

School trips and projects:

- Student exchange to Poland (11th grade)
- Language Farm in Jena (7th or 8th grade)
- Field trip/ school trip to England (9th grade)
- Field trip/ school trip to Greece (12th grade)
- "Trip to get to know each other" (5th grade)
- German American Partnership Program (GAPP) with Foothill High School (Pleasanton, California) (9th and 10th grade)

== Architecture ==
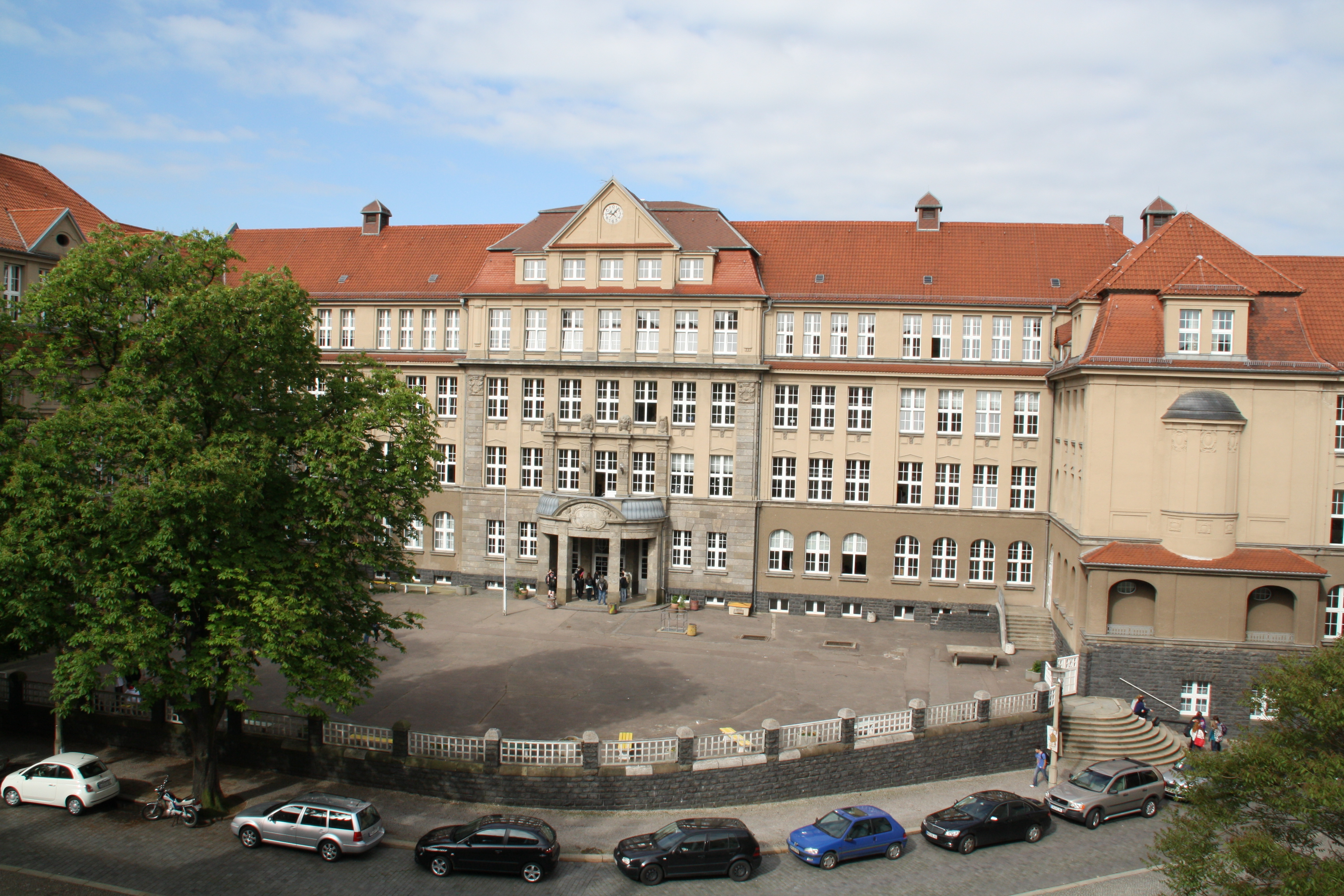
Front view

The school building displays the basic architectural principles of the Gründerzeit of Germany. The building itself is made of brick masonry, while its façade is gray plastered. With its richly decorated façades and magnificent size the school is a striking panorama, in contrast, to other typical buildings around it. Thus, a visible difference between the apartment buildings and the school is created. In 1990 the building was placed on Saxony-Anhalt's Historic Preservation's list of the most endangered historic sites.

== Fundraiser ==
On 11 August 2010, the school's fundraiser was established with 11 members; in April 2011, it had 55 active members. Its aims are exclusively nonprofit: supporting the school in cultural and scientific respects and the school's bilingual educational program. The chairman of the school's fund-raiser is the former principal Joachim Heinemann.

== Alumni ==
- Hans-Dietrich Genscher graduated in 1946, obtaining his Abitur
- Reinhard Heydrich attended the school from 1913 to 1922
