= Reinhard Heydrich =

German high-ranking Nazi official (1904–1942)

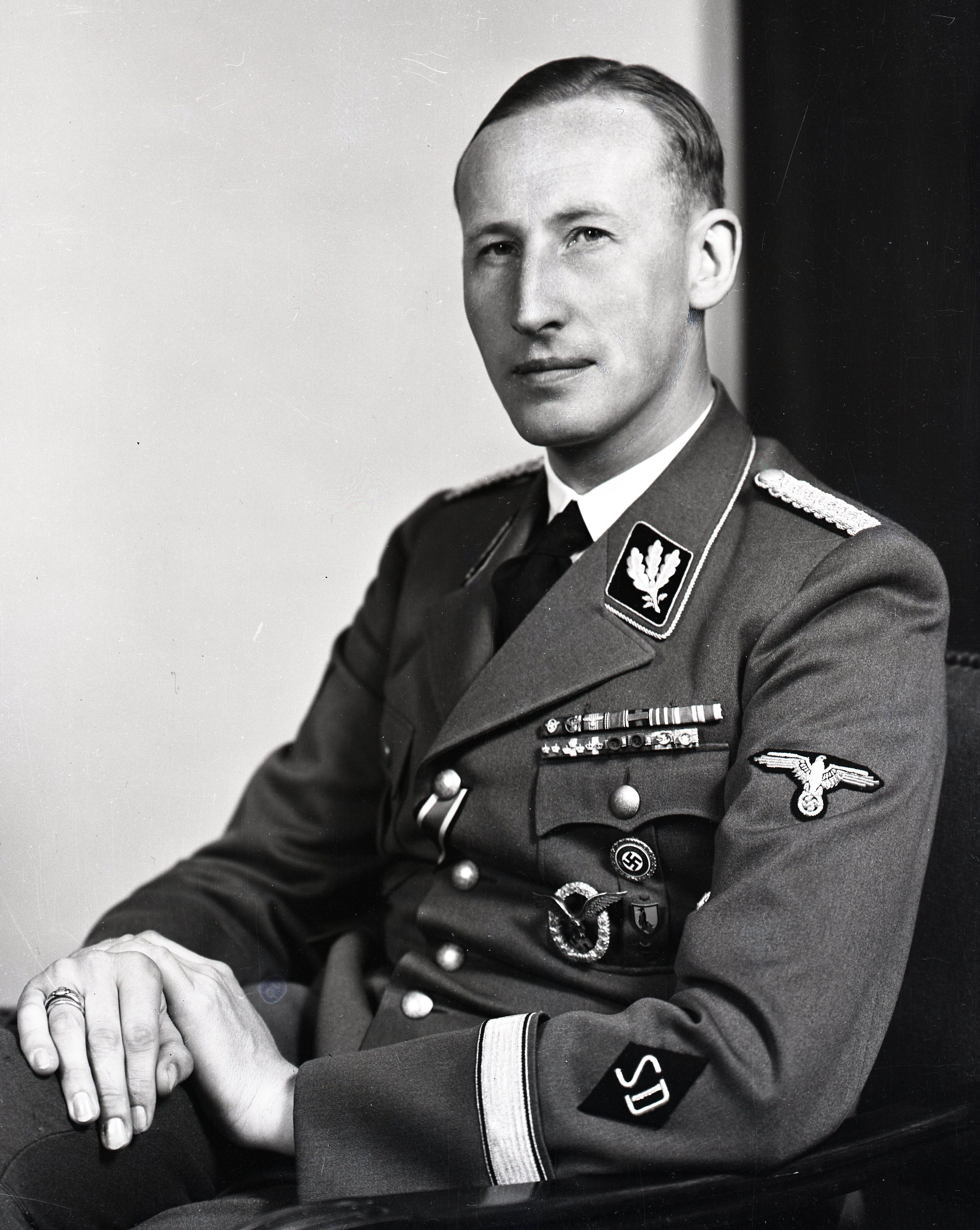
- Heydrich in 1940

Deputy Protector of Bohemia and Moravia
- In office 29 September 1941 – 4 June 1942
- Protector: Konstantin von Neurath
- Preceded by: Position established
- Succeeded by: Kurt Daluege

President of the International Criminal Police Commission
- In office 24 August 1940 – 4 June 1942
- Secretary-General: Oskar Dressler
- Preceded by: Otto Steinhäusl
- Succeeded by: Arthur Nebe

Director of the Reich Security Main Office
- In office 27 September 1939 – 4 June 1942
- Appointed by: Heinrich Himmler
- Preceded by: Office established
- Succeeded by: Heinrich Himmler (acting)

Director of the Gestapo
- In office 22 April 1934 – 27 September 1939
- Appointed by: Heinrich Himmler
- Preceded by: Rudolf Diels
- Succeeded by: Heinrich Müller

Additional positions
- 1939–1942: Commander of the Einsatzgruppen
- 1936–1942: Deputy to the Reichsführer-SS (de facto)
- 1936–1942: Reichstag Deputy
- 1936–1939: Director of the Sicherheitspolizei
- 1934–1942: Member of the Prussian State Council
- 1931–1942: Director of the Sicherheitsdienst

Personal details
- Born: Reinhard Tristan Eugen Heydrich; 7 March 1904 Halle an der Saale, Saxony, Germany
- Died: 4 June 1942 (aged 38) Prague-Libeň, Bohemia and Moravia
- Cause of death: Assassination (sepsis from wounds)
- Resting place: Invalidenfriedhof (Invalids' Cemetery), Berlin
- Party: Nazi Party (1931–1942)
- Spouse: Lina von Osten (m. 1931)
- Children: 4
- Parent: Richard Bruno Heydrich (father)
- Relatives: Heinz Heydrich (brother)
- Education: Naval Academy Mürwik
- Nicknames: The Hangman; The Butcher of Prague; The Blond Beast; Himmler's Evil Genius; The Man with the Iron Heart

Military service
- Allegiance: Weimar Republic; Nazi Germany
- Branch/service: Reichsmarine; Schutzstaffel; Luftwaffe
- Years of service: 1922–1942
- Rank: Oberleutnant zur See (Reichsmarine); Major of the Reserve (Luftwaffe); SS-Obergruppenführer und General der Polizei
- Battles/wars: World War II
- Awards: See service record section
- Heydrich's voice Heydrich speaking at the conference of the Southeast Europe Society at Prague Castle; Recorded December 1941

Reinhard Tristan Eugen Heydrich (/ˈhaɪdrɪk/; German: [ˈʁaɪnhaʁt ˈtʁɪstan ˈʔɔʏɡn̩ ˈhaɪdʁɪç]; 7 March 1904 – 4 June 1942) was a high-ranking SS and police official in Nazi Germany as well as one of the principal architects of the Holocaust. He held the rank of SS-Obergruppenführer und General der Polizei. Many historians regard Heydrich as one of the most sinister figures within the Nazi regime. Adolf Hitler described him as "the man with the iron heart".

Beginning in September 1939, Heydrich was chief of the Reich Security Main Office (including the Gestapo, Kripo, and SD). He was also Stellvertretender Reichsprotektor (Deputy Reich-Protector) of Bohemia and Moravia. He served as president of the International Criminal Police Commission (ICPC, now known as Interpol) and chaired the January 1942 Wannsee Conference which formalised plans for the "Final Solution to the Jewish question"—the deportation and genocide of all Jews in German-occupied Europe.

Heydrich was the founding head of the Sicherheitsdienst (Security Service, SD), an intelligence organisation charged with seeking out and neutralising resistance to the Nazi Party via arrests, deportations, and murders. He helped organise Kristallnacht, a series of coordinated attacks against Jews throughout Nazi Germany and parts of Austria on 9–10 November 1938. The attacks were carried out by SA stormtroopers and civilians and presaged the Holocaust. Upon his arrival in Prague, Heydrich sought to eliminate opposition to the Nazi occupation by suppressing Czech culture and deporting and executing members of the Czech resistance. He was directly responsible for the Einsatzgruppen, the special task forces that travelled in the wake of the German armies and murdered more than two million people by mass shooting and gassing including 1.3 million Jews.

Heydrich was mortally wounded in Prague on 27 May 1942 as a result of Operation Anthropoid. He was ambushed by a team of Czech and Slovak soldiers who had been sent by the Czechoslovak government-in-exile to kill him; the team was trained by the British Special Operations Executive. Heydrich died from sepsis caused by his injuries on 4 June 1942. Nazi intelligence falsely linked the Czech and Slovak soldiers and resistance partisans to the villages of Lidice and Ležáky. Both villages were razed; the men and boys aged 14 and above were shot and most of the women and children were deported and murdered in Nazi concentration camps.

== Early life ==
Reinhard Tristan Eugen Heydrich was born on 7 March 1904 in Halle an der Saale to composer and opera singer Richard Bruno Heydrich and his wife, Elisabeth Anna Maria Amalia Heydrich (née Krantz). His father came from a Protestant family, but converted to Elisabeth's Roman Catholic faith upon marriage. Although he was not of Jewish descent, rumours that Richard Heydrich had Jewish ancestry stemmed from the fact that his father’s stepfather Robert Gustav Süss appeared to have a Jewish-sounding surname.

During his youth, Heydrich was an altar boy, attending evening prayers and Mass every week with his mother as part of the Catholic minority in Halle. Two of his forenames were musical references: "Reinhard" referred to the hero from his father's opera Amen, and "Tristan" stems from Richard Wagner's Tristan und Isolde. Heydrich's third name, "Eugen", was his late maternal grandfather's forename (Eugen Krantz had been the director of the Dresden Royal Conservatory).

Heydrich's family held social standing and substantial financial means. Music was a part of Heydrich's everyday life; his father founded the Halle Conservatory of Music, Theatre, and Teaching and his mother taught piano there. As the oldest son, Reinhard was expected to inherit his father's music conservatory and was trained in music by his father, learning both the piano and violin when he was six years old. Heydrich developed a passion for the violin and carried that interest into adulthood; he impressed listeners with his musical talent.

His father was a German nationalist with loyalties to the Kaiser, who instilled patriotic ideas in his three children but was not affiliated with any political party until after World War I. The household was strict. Heydrich, initially a frail and sickly youth, was encouraged by his parents to exercise to build up his strength. He engaged his younger brother, Heinz, in mock fencing duels. He excelled in his schoolwork at the secular "Reformgymnasium", especially in the sciences. A talented athlete, he became an expert swimmer and fencer. He was shy, insecure, and was frequently bullied for his high-pitched voice and rumoured Jewish ancestry. These rumours increased after his maternal uncle Hans Krantz married a Hungarian Jew named Iza Jarmy. His family maintained cordial relations with the Jewish community; many Jewish students attended the Halle Conservatory, and its cellar was rented out to a Jewish salesman. Heydrich was friends with Abraham Lichtenstein, son of the cantor.

In 1918, World War I ended with Germany's defeat. In late February 1919, civil unrest—including strikes and clashes between communist and anti-communist groups—took place in Heydrich's home town of Halle. Under Defense Minister Gustav Noske's directives, paramilitary Freikorps units recaptured Halle. Heydrich, then 15 years old, joined the Freikorps Maercker's Volunteer Rifles. This was largely symbolic, as Heydrich was too young for military service. There is no evidence that he participated in the fighting, and when the skirmishes ended, he was part of the force assigned to protect private property. Heydrich began to form positive opinions about the Völkisch movement and anti-communism, as well as a distaste for the Treaty of Versailles and the positioning of the German-Polish border. Heydrich stated that he joined the Deutschvölkischer Schutz- und Trutzbund (German Nationalist Protection and Defiance League), an antisemitic organisation. Despite his making this claim on his official officer's personnel record, the sufficiency of documentation supporting his membership has been questioned. However, it is also supported by a contemporaneous official Nazi Party publication, which states that Heydrich was a member of the league from 1920 (when he left the German National Youth League) until he was forced to withdraw when he entered the German Navy in 1922. (Note: In addition to the documentation provided by the citation to Das Deutsche Führerlexikon, Heydrich's membership in Deutschvölkischer Schutz- und Trutzbund (DVSTB) is documented in works by Ernst Klee, (Das Personenlexikon zum Dritten Reich. Wer war was vor und nach 1945 p. 253), Uwe Lohalm (Völkischer Radikalismus: die Geschichte des Deutschvölkischen Schutz- und Trutz-Bundes, 1919-1923 p. 327) and Michael D. Miller (Leaders of the SS & German Police, p. 117). The issue of questionable documentation raised by Robert Gerwarth (Hitler's Hangman, pp. 30–31) has to do with a postcard concerning the Germanenorden, not the DVSTB. The preponderance of reliable sources supports membership. (N.B.: Membership also is accepted in the German wiki article.))

As a result of the conditions of the Treaty of Versailles as well as Germany's large war debt, hyperinflation spread across Germany and many lost their life savings. Halle was not spared. By 1921, few townspeople there could afford a music education at Bruno Heydrich's conservatory. This led to a financial crisis for the Heydrich family.

== Naval career ==
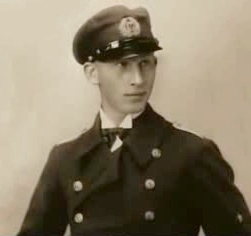
Heydrich as a Reichsmarine cadet in 1922

In 1922, Heydrich joined the German Navy (Reichsmarine), taking advantage of the security, structure, and pension it offered. He became a naval cadet at Kiel, Germany's primary naval base. Many of Heydrich's fellow cadets falsely regarded him as Jewish. To counteract these rumours, Heydrich informed them that he had been a member of several antisemitic and nationalist organisations, such as the Deutschvölkischer Schutz- und Trutzbund, and this improved his standing with his peers. On 1 April 1924, he was promoted to senior midshipman (Oberfähnrich zur See) and sent to officer training at the Naval Academy Mürwik. In 1926, he advanced to the rank of ensign (Leutnant zur See) and was assigned as a signals officer on the battleship SMS Schleswig-Holstein, the flagship of Germany's North Sea Fleet. With the promotion came greater recognition. He received good evaluations from his superiors and had few problems with other crewmen. He was promoted on 1 July 1928 to the rank of first lieutenant.

Heydrich became notorious for his numerous affairs. In December 1930 he attended a rowing-club ball and met Lina von Osten. They became romantically involved and soon got engaged. Lina was already a Nazi Party follower and antisemite; she had attended her first rally in 1929. Early in 1931 Heydrich was charged with "conduct unbecoming an officer and a gentleman" for a breach of promise, having been engaged to marry another woman he had known for six months before becoming engaged to von Osten. Admiral Erich Raeder dismissed Heydrich from the navy in April. He received severance pay of 200 Reichsmarks (equivalent to €755 in 2021) a month for the next two years. Heydrich married Lina in December 1931.

== Career in the SS ==
On 30 May 1931, Heydrich's discharge from the navy became legally binding, and either the following day or on 1 June he joined the Nazi Party in Hamburg. Six weeks later, on 14 July, he joined the SS. His party number was 544,916 and his SS number was 10,120. Those who joined the party after Hitler's seizure of power in January 1933 faced suspicions from the Alte Kämpfer (Old Fighters; the earliest party members) that they had joined for reasons of career advancement rather than a true commitment to Nazi ideology. Heydrich's date of enlistment in 1931 was early enough to quell suspicion that he had joined only to further his career, but was not early enough for him to be considered an Old Fighter.

In 1931, Heinrich Himmler began setting up a counterintelligence division of the SS. Acting on the advice of his associate Karl von Eberstein, who was Lina's friend and already close to Heydrich, Himmler agreed to interview Heydrich, but cancelled their appointment at the last minute. Lina ignored this message, packed Heydrich's suitcase, and sent him to Munich. Eberstein met Heydrich at the railway station and took him to see Himmler. Himmler asked Heydrich to convey his ideas for developing an SS intelligence service. Himmler was so impressed that he hired Heydrich immediately.

Although the starting monthly salary of 180 Reichsmarks (equivalent to €679 in 2021) was low, Heydrich decided to take the job because Lina's family supported the Nazi movement, and the quasi-military and revolutionary nature of the post appealed to him. At first he had to share an office and typewriter with a colleague, but by 1932 Heydrich was earning 290 Reichsmarks a month (equivalent to €1,191 in 2021), a salary he described as "comfortable". As his power and influence grew throughout the 1930s, his wealth grew commensurately; in 1935 he received a base salary of 8,400 Reichsmarks (equivalent to €38,766 in 2021) and an allowance of 12,000 Reichsmarks (equivalent to €55,379 in 2021) and by 1938 his income increased to 17,371 Reichsmarks (equivalent to €77,580 in 2021), annually. Heydrich later received a Totenkopfring from Himmler for his SS service.

On 1 August 1931, Heydrich began his job as chief of the new 'Ic Service' (intelligence service). He set up office at the Brown House, the Nazi Party headquarters in Munich. By October he had created a network of spies and informers for intelligence-gathering purposes and to obtain information to be used as blackmail to further political aims. Information on thousands of people was recorded on index cards and stored at the Brown House. To mark the occasion of Heydrich's December wedding, Himmler promoted him to the rank of SS-Sturmbannführer (major).

In 1932, rumours were spread by Heydrich's enemies of his alleged Jewish ancestry. Wilhelm Canaris said he had obtained copies of documents proving Heydrich's Jewish ancestry. Nazi Gauleiter Rudolf Jordan claimed Heydrich was not a pure Aryan. Himmler reportedly said that Heydrich was "an unhappy man, completely divided against himself, as often happened with those of mixed race". Within the Nazi organisation such innuendo could be damning, even for the head of the Reich's counterintelligence service. Gregor Strasser passed the allegations on to the Nazi Party's racial expert, Achim Gercke, who investigated Heydrich's genealogy. Gercke reported that Heydrich was "... of German origin and free from any coloured and Jewish blood". He insisted that the rumours were baseless. Even so, Heydrich privately engaged SD member Ernst Hoffmann to further investigate and dispel the rumours.

=== Gestapo and SD ===
Gestapo headquarters on Prinz-Albrecht-Strasse in Berlin, 1933

In mid-1932, Himmler appointed Heydrich chief of the renamed security service—the Sicherheitsdienst (SD). Heydrich's counterintelligence service grew into an effective machine of terror and intimidation. With Hitler striving for absolute power in Germany, Himmler and Heydrich wished to control the political police forces of all 17 German states. They began with Bavaria. In 1933, Heydrich gathered some of his men from the SD and together they stormed police headquarters in Munich and took over the organisation using intimidation tactics. Himmler became the Munich police chief and Heydrich became the commander of Department IV, the political police.

In 1933, Hitler became Chancellor of Germany, and through a series of decrees became Germany's Führer und Reichskanzler (leader and chancellor). The first concentration camps, which were originally intended to house political opponents, were established in early 1933. By year's end there were over fifty camps.

Hermann Göring founded the Gestapo in 1933 as a Prussian police force. When Göring transferred full authority over the Gestapo to Himmler in April 1934, it immediately became an instrument of terror under the SS's purview. Himmler named Heydrich to head the Gestapo on 22 April 1934. Also in April, Göring made Heydrich an advisor to the Prussian government with an appointment to the Prussian State Council. On 9 June 1934, Rudolf Hess declared the SD the official Nazi intelligence service.

=== Crushing the SA ===
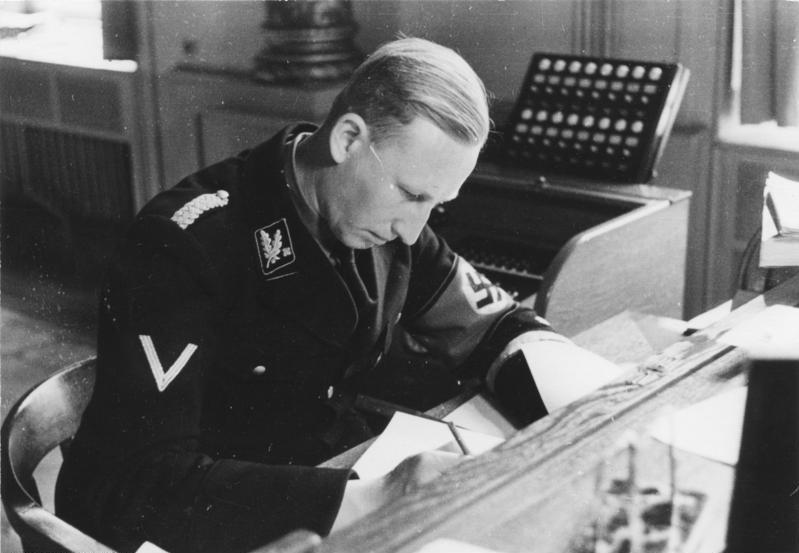
SS-Brigadeführer Heydrich, head of the Bavarian police and SD, in Munich, 1934

Beginning in April 1934, and at Hitler's request, Heydrich and Himmler began building a dossier on Sturmabteilung (SA) leader Ernst Röhm in an effort to remove him as a rival for party leadership. At this point, the SS was still part of the SA, the early Nazi paramilitary organisation which now numbered over three million men. At Hitler's direction, Heydrich, Himmler, Göring, and Viktor Lutze drew up lists of those who should be killed, starting with seven top SA officials and including many more. On 30 June 1934 the SS and Gestapo acted in coordinated mass arrests that continued for two days. Röhm was shot without trial, along with the leadership of the SA. The purge became known as the Night of the Long Knives. Up to 200 people were killed in the action. Lutze was appointed SA's new head and it was converted into a sports and training organisation.

With the SA out of the way, Heydrich began building the Gestapo into an instrument of fear. He improved his index-card system, creating categories of offenders with colour-coded cards. The Gestapo had the authority to arrest citizens on the suspicion that they might commit a crime, and the definition of a crime was at their discretion. The Gestapo Law, passed in 1936, gave police the right to act extra-legally. This led to the sweeping use of Schutzhaft—"protective custody", a euphemism for the power to imprison people without judicial proceedings. The courts were not allowed to investigate or interfere. The Gestapo was considered to be acting legally as long as it was carrying out the leadership's will. People were arrested arbitrarily, sent to concentration camps, or killed.

At the March 1936 parliamentary election, Heydrich was elected as a deputy to the Reichstag from electoral constituency 22 Düsseldorf East. He was reelected at the April 1938 election and held this seat until his death.

Himmler began developing the notion of a Germanic religion and wanted SS members to leave the church. In early 1936, Heydrich left the Catholic Church in favour of the Gottgläubig movement. His wife, Lina, had already done so the year before. Heydrich not only felt he could no longer be a member, but came to consider the church's political power and influence a danger to the state.

=== Consolidating the police forces ===
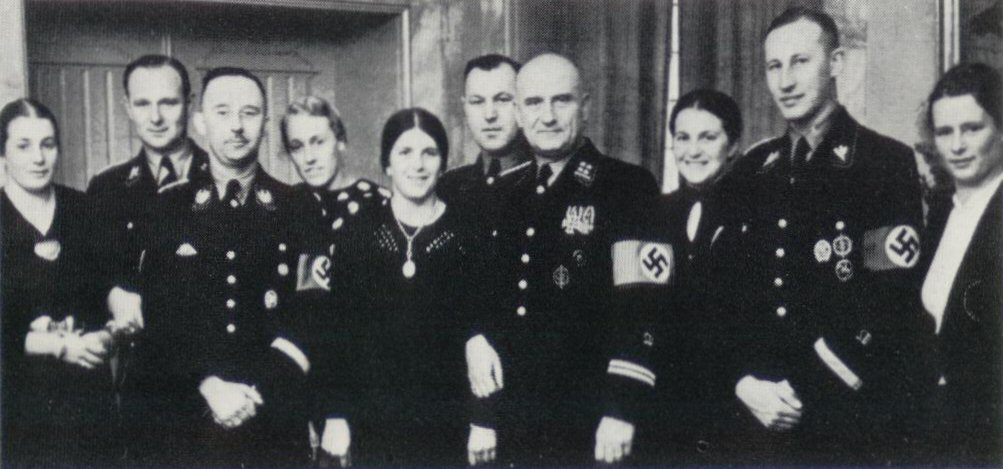
Heydrich and other SS officers with their wives in 1937

On 17 June 1936, all police forces throughout Germany were united, following Hitler's appointment of Himmler as Chief of German Police. With this appointment by Hitler, Himmler and his de facto deputy, Heydrich, became two of the most powerful men in the internal administration of Germany. Himmler immediately reorganised the police into two groups: the Ordnungspolizei (Order Police; Orpo), consisting of both the national uniformed police and the municipal police; and the Sicherheitspolizei (Security Police; SiPo), consisting of the Geheime Staatspolizei (Secret State Police; Gestapo) and Kriminalpolizei (Criminal Police; Kripo). At that point, Heydrich was head of the SiPo and SD. Heinrich Müller was the Gestapo's operations chief. Under the direction of Reichsminister Hans Frank, Heydrich published a strategy for the destruction of enemies of the German State.

Heydrich was assigned to help organise the 1936 Summer Olympics in Berlin. The games were used to promote the propaganda aims of the Nazi regime. Goodwill ambassadors were sent to countries that were considering a boycott. Anti-Jewish violence was forbidden for the duration, and news stands were required to stop displaying copies of Der Stürmer. For his part in the games' success, Heydrich was awarded the Deutsches Olympiaehrenzeichen or German Olympic Games Decoration (First Class).

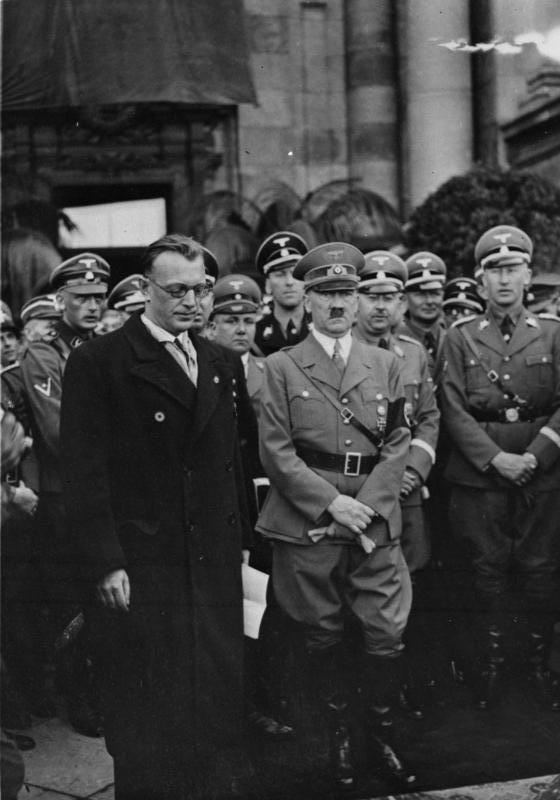
Arthur Seyss-Inquart, Martin Bormann, Adolf Hitler, Heinrich Himmler, and Heydrich in Vienna, March 1938

In January 1937, Heydrich directed the SD to secretly begin collecting and analysing public opinion and report its findings to him. He then had the Gestapo carry out house searches, arrests, and interrogations, thus in effect exercising control over public opinion. In February 1938 when the Austrian Chancellor Kurt Schuschnigg resisted Hitler's proposed merger with Germany, Heydrich intensified the pressure on Austria by organising Nazi demonstrations and distributing propaganda in Vienna emphasising the common Germanic blood of the two countries. In the Anschluss on 12 March, Hitler declared the unification of Austria with Nazi Germany.

In mid-1939, Heydrich created the Stiftung Nordhav Foundation to obtain real estate for the SS and Security Police to use as guest houses and vacation spots. The Wannsee Villa, which Stiftung Nordhav acquired in November 1940, was the site of the Wannsee Conference (20 January 1942). Heydrich was the lead speaker. At Wannsee, senior Nazi officials formalised plans to deport and exterminate all Jews in German-occupied territory and those countries not yet conquered. This action was to be coordinated among the representatives from the Nazi state agencies present at the meeting.

On 27 September 1939, the SD and SiPo—made up of the Gestapo and the Criminal Police, or Kripo—were folded into the new Reich Security Main Office or Reichssicherheitshauptamt (RSHA), which was placed under Heydrich's control. The title of Chef der Sicherheitspolizei und des SD (Chief of Security Police and SD) or CSSD was conferred on Heydrich on 1 October. Heydrich became the president of the International Criminal Police Commission (later known as Interpol) on 24 August 1940, and its headquarters were transferred to Berlin. He was promoted to SS-Obergruppenführer und General der Polizei on 24 September 1941.

=== Red Army purges ===
In 1936, Heydrich learned that a top-ranking Soviet officer was plotting to overthrow Joseph Stalin. Sensing an opportunity to strike a blow at both the Soviet Army and Admiral Canaris of Germany's Abwehr, Heydrich decided that the Soviet officer should be "unmasked". He discussed the matter with Himmler and both in turn brought it to Hitler's attention. Hitler approved Heydrich's plan to act immediately. But the "information" Heydrich had received was actually misinformation planted by Stalin himself in an attempt to legitimise his planned purges of the Red Army's high command. Stalin ordered one of his best NKVD agents, General Nikolai Skoblin, to pass Heydrich false information suggesting that Marshal Mikhail Tukhachevsky and other Soviet generals were plotting against Stalin.

Heydrich's SD forged documents and letters implicating Tukhachevsky and other Red Army commanders. The material was delivered to the NKVD. The Great Purge of the Red Army followed on Stalin's orders. While Heydrich believed they had deluded Stalin into executing or dismissing 35,000 of his officer corps, the importance of Heydrich's part is a matter of conjecture. Soviet military prosecutors did not use SD forged documents against the generals in their secret trial; they instead relied on false confessions extorted or beaten out of the defendants.

=== Night-and-Fog decree ===
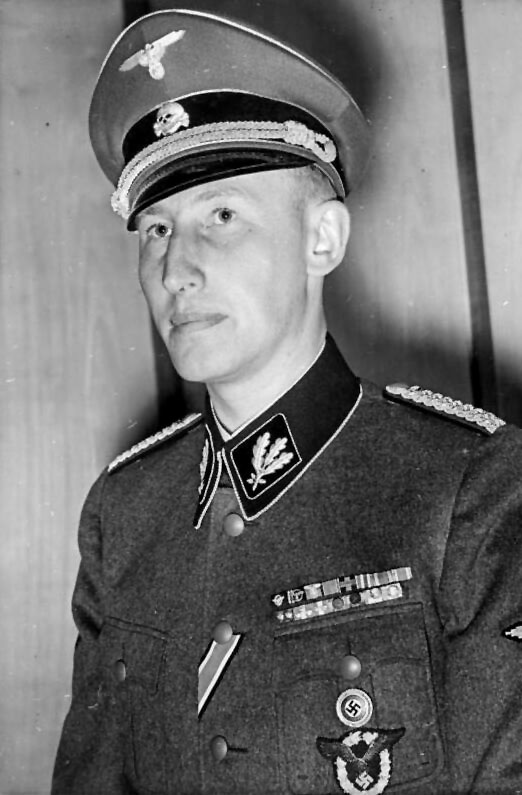
Heydrich in 1940

By late 1940, German armies had invaded most of Western Europe. The following year, Heydrich's SD was given responsibility for carrying out the Nacht und Nebel (Night-and-Fog) decree. According to the decree, "persons endangering German security" were to be arrested in a maximally discreet way: "under the cover of night and fog". People disappeared without a trace with no one told of their whereabouts or fate. For each prisoner, the SD had to fill in a questionnaire that listed personal information, country of origin, and the details of their crimes against the Reich. This questionnaire was placed in an envelope inscribed with a seal reading "Nacht und Nebel" and submitted to the Reich Security Main Office (RSHA). In the WVHA "Central Inmate File", as in many camp files, these prisoners would be given a special "covert prisoner" code, as opposed to the code for POW, Felon, Jew, Gypsy, etc. (Note: For the coding of prisoners, see IBM and the Holocaust by Edwin Black, pp 355 and 362. Black references the "Administration of German Concentration Camps", 9 July 1945, PRO FO 371/46979 (Public Record Office, London), as well as "Decoding Key for Concentration Camp Card Index Files", n.d. NARG242/338 T-1021 Roll 5, JAG (National Archives, College Park); and in the last source Frame 99 is mentioned.) The decree remained in effect after Heydrich's death. The exact number of people who vanished under it has never been positively established, but it is estimated to be 7,000.

=== Anti-Polish policies ===
Heydrich created the "Zentralstelle IIP Polen" unit of the Gestapo to coordinate the ethnic cleansing of Poles in "Operation Tannenberg" and the Intelligenzaktion, two codenames for extermination actions directed at the Polish people during the German occupation of Poland. Among the 100,000 people murdered in the Intelligenzaktion operations in 1939–1940, approximately 61,000 were members of the Polish intelligentsia: scholars, clergy, former officers, and others, whom the Germans identified as political targets in the Special Prosecution Book-Poland, compiled before the war began in September 1939.

=== Deputy Reich Protector of Bohemia and Moravia ===
Heydrich (left) with Karl Hermann Frank at Prague Castle in 1941

On 27 September 1941, Heydrich was appointed Deputy Reich Protector of the Protectorate of Bohemia and Moravia (the part of Czechoslovakia incorporated into the Reich on 15 March 1939) and assumed control of the territory. The Reich Protector, Konstantin von Neurath, remained the territory's titular head, but was sent on "leave" because Hitler, Himmler, and Heydrich felt his "soft approach" to the Czechs had promoted anti-German sentiment and encouraged anti-German resistance via strikes and sabotage. Upon his appointment, Heydrich told his aides: "We will Germanize the Czech vermin."

Heydrich came to Prague to enforce policy, fight resistance to the Nazi regime, and keep up production quotas of Czech motors and arms that were "extremely important to the German war effort". He viewed the area as a bulwark of Germandom and condemned the Czech resistance's "stabs in the back". To realise his goals, Heydrich demanded racial classification of those who could and could not be Germanized. He explained, "Making this Czech garbage into Germans must give way to methods based on racist thought."

Heydrich started his rule by terrorising the population: he proclaimed martial law, and 142 people were executed within five days of his arrival in Prague. Their names appeared on posters throughout the occupied country. Most of them were the members of the resistance that had previously been captured and were awaiting trial.

According to Heydrich's estimate, between 4,000 and 5,000 people were arrested and between 400 and 500 were executed by February 1942. (Note: According to Czech historians, during the first martial law period (from 28 September 1941 until 20 January 1942), 486 people were executed. In addition, many of the 2,242 people sent to Mauthausen died before the end of the period, some within days or weeks of their arrival. Šír 2011.) Those who were not executed were sent to Mauthausen-Gusen concentration camp, where only four per cent of Czech prisoners survived the war. Czech prime minister Alois Eliáš was among those arrested the first day. He was put on trial in Berlin and sentenced to death, but was kept alive as a hostage. He was later executed in retaliation for Heydrich's assassination.

In March 1942, further sweeps against Czech cultural and patriotic organisations, the military, and the intelligentsia resulted in the practical paralysis of the London-based Czech resistance. Almost all avenues by which Czechs could express the Czech culture in public were closed. Although small disorganised cells of Central Leadership of Home Resistance (Ústřední vedení odboje domácího, ÚVOD) survived, only the communist resistance was able to function in a coordinated manner (although it also suffered arrests). The terror also served to paralyse resistance in society, with public and widespread reprisals by the Nazis against any action resisting German rule. Heydrich's brutal policies during that time quickly earned him the nickname "the Butcher of Prague". The reprisals are referred to by Czechs as the Heydrichiáda.

As Deputy Reich Protector of Bohemia and Moravia, Heydrich applied carrot-and-stick methods. Labor was reorganised on the basis of the German Labour Front. Heydrich used equipment confiscated from the Czech gymnastics organisation Sokol to organise events for workers. Food rations and free shoes were distributed, pensions were increased, and (for a time) free Saturdays were introduced. Unemployment insurance was established for the first time. The black market was suppressed. Those associated with it or the resistance movement were tortured or executed. Heydrich labelled them "economic criminals" and "enemies of the people", which helped gain him support. Conditions in Prague and the rest of the Czech lands were relatively peaceful under Heydrich, and industrial output increased. Still, those measures could not hide shortages and increasing inflation; reports of growing discontent multiplied.

Despite public displays of goodwill towards the populace, privately Heydrich was very clear about his eventual goal: "This entire area will one day be definitely German, and the Czechs have nothing to expect here." Eventually up to two-thirds of the populace were to be either removed to regions of Russia or exterminated after Nazi Germany won the war. Bohemia and Moravia faced annexation directly into the German Reich.

The Czech workforce was exploited as Nazi-conscripted labour. More than 100,000 workers were removed from "unsuitable" jobs and conscripted by the Ministry of Labour. By December 1941, Czechs could be called to work anywhere within the Reich. Between April and November 1942, 79,000 Czech workers were taken in this manner for work within Nazi Germany. Also, in February 1942, the work day was increased from eight to twelve hours.

Heydrich was, for all intents and purposes, military dictator of Bohemia and Moravia. His changes to the government's structure left President Emil Hácha and his cabinet virtually powerless. He often drove alone in a car with an open roof – a show of his confidence in the occupation forces and in his government's effectiveness.

By 3 October 1941, Czechoslovak military intelligence in London had made the decision to kill Heydrich.

== Role in the Holocaust ==
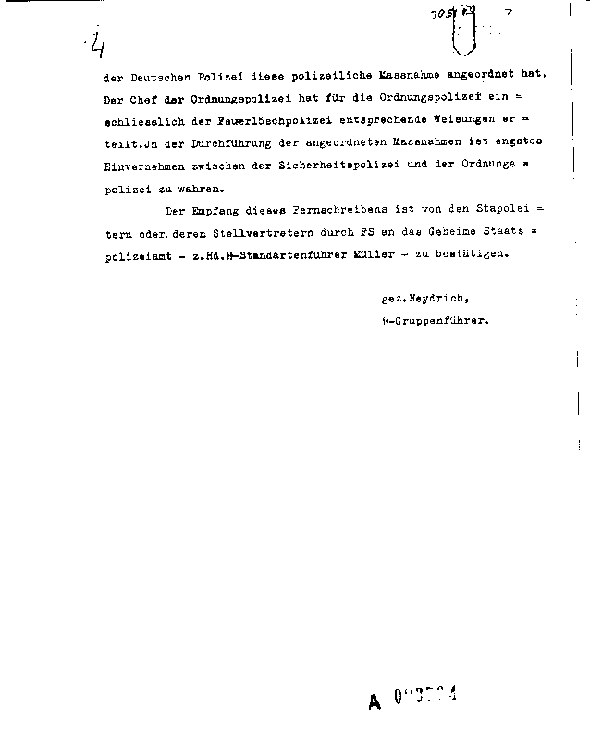
1938 telegram giving orders during Kristallnacht, signed by Heydrich

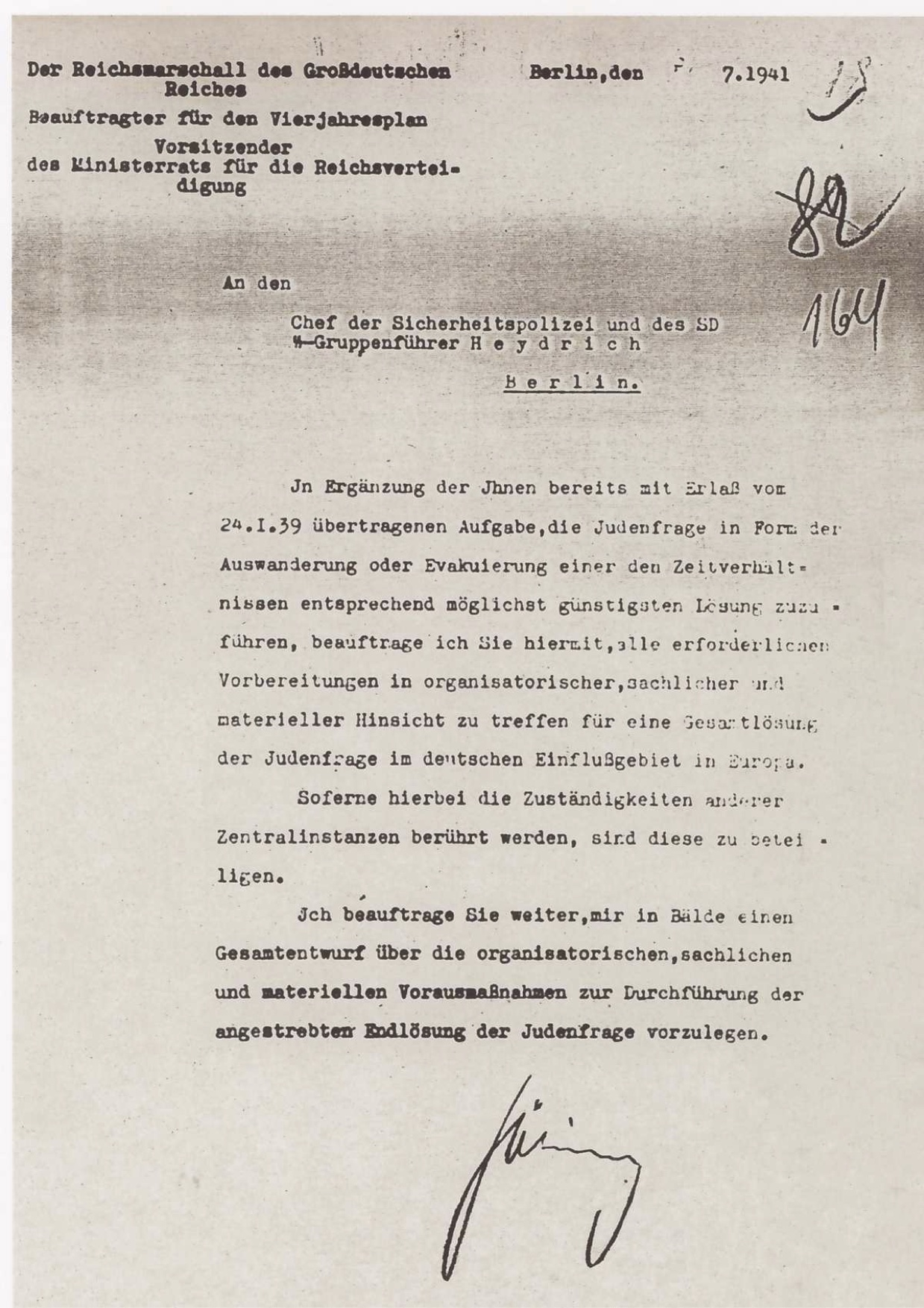
July 1941 letter from Göring to Heydrich concerning the Final Solution of the Jewish question

Historians regard Heydrich as the most fearsome member of the Nazi elite. Hitler called him "the man with the iron heart". William L. Shirer described Heydrich as "of diabolical cast, the genius of the 'Final Solution.'" He was one of the main architects of the Holocaust during the early war years, answering to and taking orders from only Hitler, Göring, and Himmler in all matters pertaining to the deportation, imprisonment, and extermination of Jews.

Heydrich was one of the organisers of Kristallnacht, a pogrom against Jews throughout Germany on the night of 9–10 November 1938. Heydrich sent a telegram that night to various SD and Gestapo offices, helping to coordinate the pogrom with the SS, SD, Gestapo, uniformed police (Orpo), SA, Nazi party officials, and even the fire departments. In the telegram, Heydrich granted permission for arson and destruction of Jewish businesses and synagogues, and ordered the confiscation of all "archival material" from Jewish community centres and synagogues. The telegram ordered that "as many Jews – particularly affluent Jews – are to be arrested in all districts as can be accommodated in existing detention facilities ... Immediately after the arrests have been carried out, the appropriate concentration camps should be contacted to place the Jews into camps as quickly as possible." Twenty thousand Jews were sent to concentration camps in the days immediately following; historians consider Kristallnacht the beginning of the Holocaust.

When Hitler asked for a pretext for the invasion of Poland in 1939, Himmler, Heydrich, and Heinrich Müller masterminded a false flag plan code-named Operation Himmler. It involved a fake attack on the German radio station at Gleiwitz on 31 August 1939. Heydrich masterminded the plan and toured the site, which was about four miles (6 km) from the Polish border. Wearing Polish uniforms, 150 German troops carried out several attacks along the border. Hitler used the ruse as an excuse to launch his invasion.

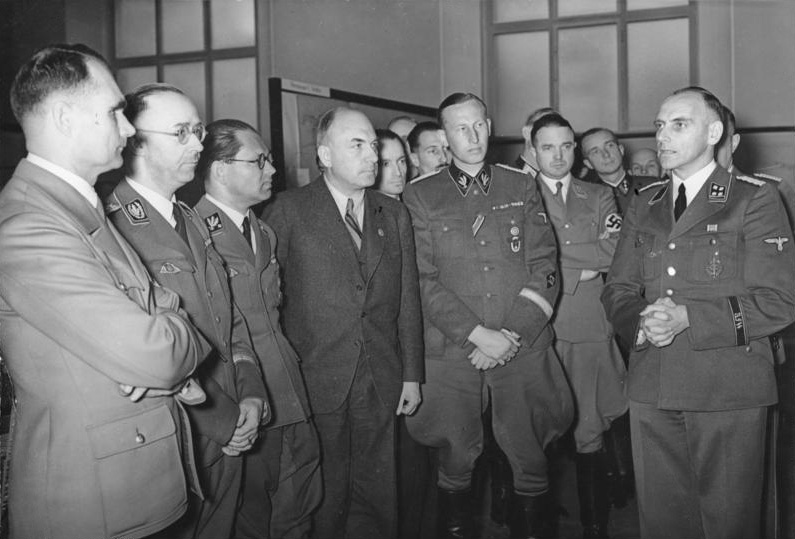
Rudolf Hess, Himmler, Philipp Bouhler, Fritz Todt, and Heydrich listening to Konrad Meyer at a Generalplan Ost exhibition, 20 March 1941

On Himmler's instructions, Heydrich formed the Einsatzgruppen (task forces) to travel in the wake of the German armies at the start of World War II. On 21 September 1939, Heydrich sent out a teleprinter message on the "Jewish question in the occupied territory" to the chiefs of all Einsatzgruppen with instructions to round up Jewish people for placement into ghettos, called for the formation of Judenräte (Jewish councils), ordered a census, and promoted Aryanization plans for Jewish-owned businesses and farms, among other measures. (Note: The telegram is evidence number PS-3363 from the Oswald Pohl case at the Nuremberg Trials. A translation of the text is available at yadvashem.org.) The Einsatzgruppen units followed the army into Poland to implement the plans. Later, in the Soviet Union, they were charged with rounding up and murdering Jews via firing squad and gas vans. Historian Raul Hilberg estimates that between 1941 and 1945 the Einsatzgruppen and related auxiliary troops murdered more than two million people, including 1.3 million Jews. Heydrich ensured the safety of certain athletes, such as Paul Sommer, a Jewish German champion fencer he knew from his pre-SS days, and the Polish Olympic fencing team that competed at the 1936 Summer Olympics.

... the planned total measures are to be kept strictly secret ... the first prerequisite for the final aim ("Endziel") is the concentration of the Jews from the countryside into the larger cities.

— Heydrich, September 1939

By order of the Reichsführer-SS, residency without possession of an identification card is punishable by death.

— Heydrich, November 1939

On 29 November 1939, Heydrich issued a cable about the "Evacuation of New Eastern Provinces", detailing the deportation of people by railway to concentration camps, and giving guidance surrounding the December 1939 census, which would be the basis on which those deportations were performed. In May 1941 Heydrich drew up regulations with Quartermaster general Eduard Wagner for the upcoming invasion of the Soviet Union, which ensured that the Einsatzgruppen and army would co-operate in murdering Soviet Jews.

On 10 October 1941, Heydrich was the senior officer at a "Final Solution" meeting of the RSHA (Note: This description of the meeting was employed by Holocaust historian Raul Hilberg in The Destruction of the European Jews. Hilberg 1985, p. 164.) in Prague that discussed deporting 50,000 Jews from the Protectorate of Bohemia and Moravia to ghettos in Minsk and Riga. Given his position, Heydrich was instrumental in carrying out these plans since his Gestapo was ready to organise deportations in the West and his Einsatzgruppen were already conducting extensive killing operations in the East. The officers attending also discussed taking 5,000 Jews from Prague "in the next few weeks" and handing them over to the Einsatzgruppen commanders Arthur Nebe and Otto Rasch. Establishing ghettos in the Protectorate was also planned, resulting in the construction of the Theresienstadt Ghetto, where 33,000 people would eventually die. Tens of thousands more passed through the camp before being sent East to be murdered. In 1941 Himmler named Heydrich as "responsible for implementing" the forced movement of 60,000 Jews from Germany and Czechoslovakia to the Łódź (Litzmannstadt) Ghetto in Poland.

Earlier on 31 July 1941, Hermann Göring gave written authorisation to Heydrich to ensure the co-operation of administrative leaders of various government departments in the implementation of a "final solution to the Jewish question" in territories under German control. On 20 January 1942, Heydrich chaired a meeting, now called the Wannsee Conference, to discuss the implementation of the plan.

== Death ==
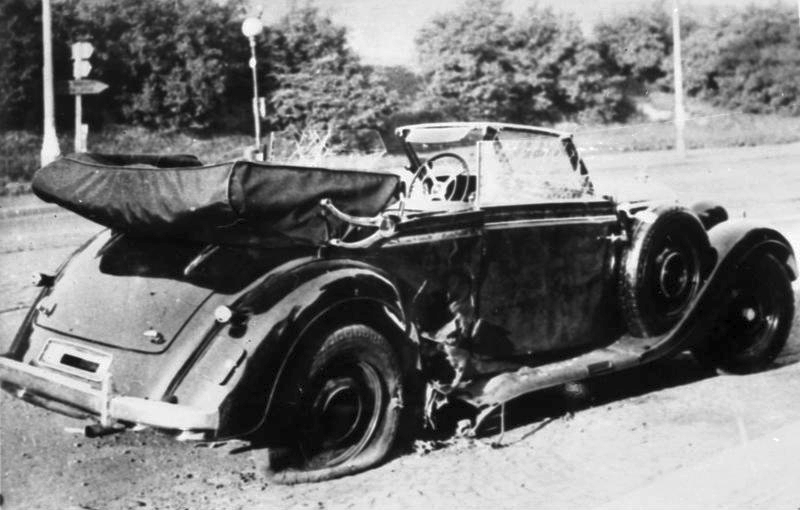
The Mercedes-Benz 320 Convertible B in which Heydrich was mortally wounded

Czechoslovak SOE agents who killed Heydrich

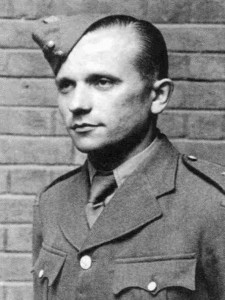
Jozef Gabčík, c. 1942

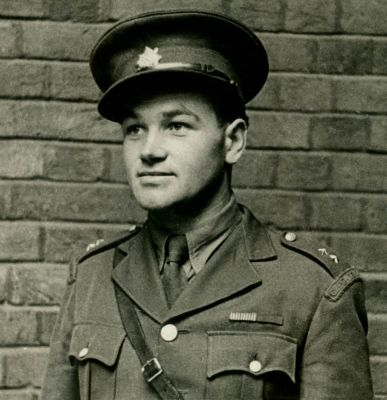
Jan Kubiš, c. 1942

In London, the Czechoslovak government-in-exile resolved to kill Heydrich. Jan Kubiš and Jozef Gabčík headed the team chosen for the mission, trained by the British Special Operations Executive (SOE). On 28 December 1941 they parachuted into the Protectorate, where they lived in hiding, preparing for the mission.

On 27 May 1942, Heydrich planned to meet Hitler in Berlin. German documents suggest that Hitler intended to transfer him to German-occupied France where the French Resistance was gaining ground. To get from his home to the airport, Heydrich would have to pass a section where the Dresden-Prague road merges with a road to the Troja Bridge. The junction in the Prague suburb of Libeň was well suited for the attack because motorists have to slow for a hairpin bend. As Heydrich's car slowed, Gabčík took aim with a Sten submachine gun, but it jammed and failed to fire. Heydrich ordered his driver, Klein, to halt and attempted to confront Gabčík rather than speed away. Kubiš, who had not been spotted by Heydrich or Klein, threw a converted anti-tank mine at the car as it stopped. It landed against the rear wheel. The explosion ripped through the right rear fender and wounded Heydrich with metal fragments and fibres from the upholstery causing serious damage to his left side: he suffered major injuries to his diaphragm, spleen, and one lung, as well as a broken rib. Kubiš received a minor shrapnel wound to his face. After Kubiš fled, Heydrich ordered Klein to chase Gabčík on foot, but Gabčík escaped after he shot and wounded Klein.

A Czech woman went to Heydrich's aid and flagged down a delivery van. He was placed on his stomach in the back of the van and taken to the emergency room at Bulovka Hospital. A splenectomy was performed and the chest wound, left lung, and diaphragm were all debrided. Himmler ordered Karl Gebhardt to fly to Prague to assume care. Despite a fever, Heydrich's recovery appeared to progress well. Hitler's personal doctor Theodor Morell suggested the use of the new antibacterial drug sulfonamide, but Gebhardt thought that Heydrich would recover and declined the suggestion. Heydrich reconciled himself to his fate on 2 June, during a visit by Himmler, by reciting a quotation from one of his father's operas:

Ja, die Welt ist nur ein Leierkasten,
den unser Herrgott selber dreht.
Jeder muß nach dem Liede tanzen,
das gerade auf der Walze steht.

Yes, the world is just a barrel-organ
which the Lord God turns Himself.
We all have to dance to the tune
which is already on the drum.

On 3 June, Heydrich fell into a coma; he died the following day. An autopsy concluded that he died of sepsis. Later researchers suggest that pulmonary embolism and/or brain ischemia may have been decisive factors. (Note: G. M. Weisz of the University of New South Wales and W. R. Albury of the University of New England (Australia) have argued that the failure to administer thiazole sulfonamides, through negligence or otherwise, may have precipitated his death.) He was 38 years old.

=== Funeral ===
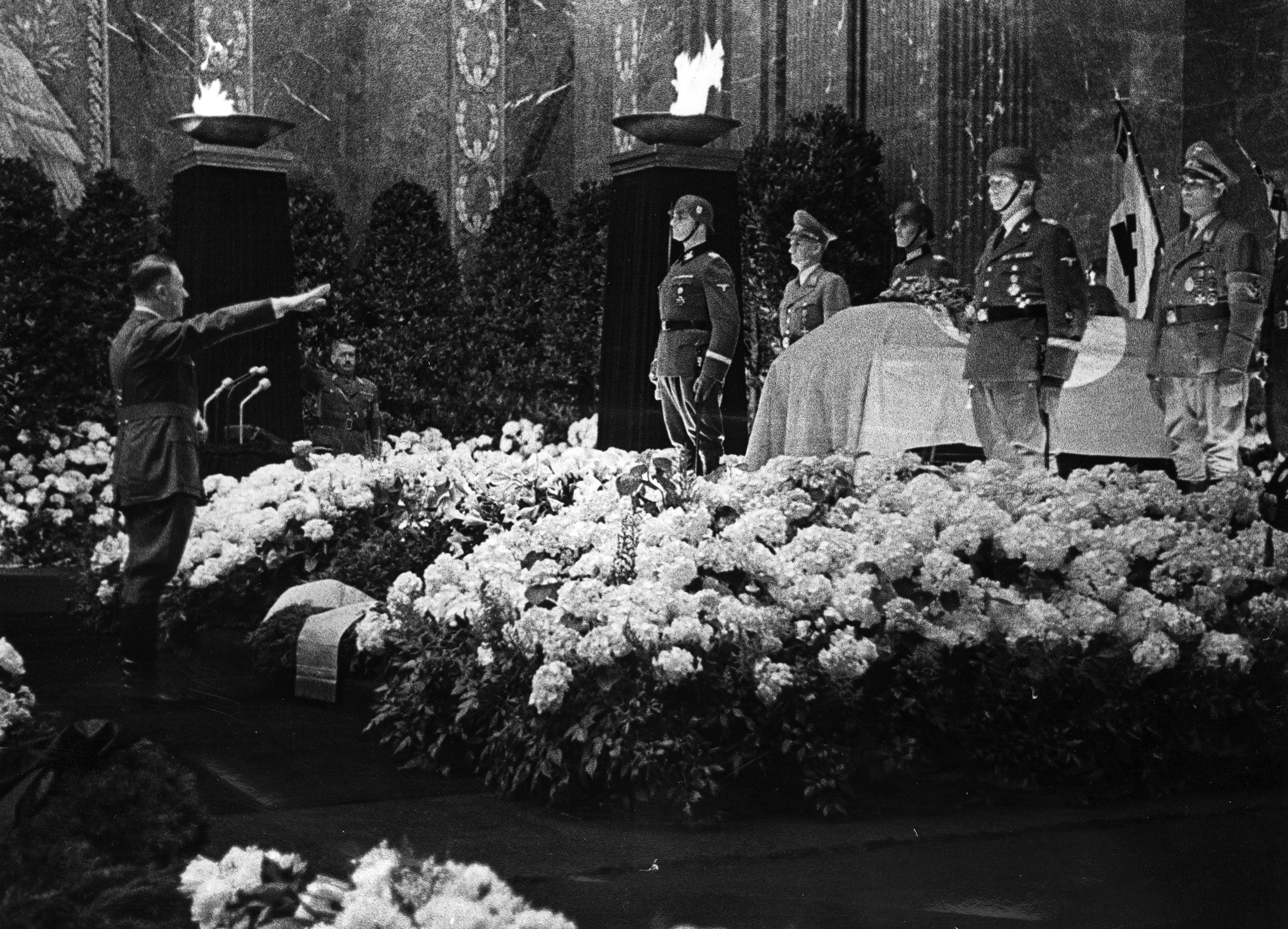
Second funeral ceremony, 9 June 1942

After an elaborate funeral held in Prague on 7 June 1942, Heydrich's coffin was placed on a train to Berlin where a second ceremony was held in the new Reich Chancellery on 9 June. Himmler gave the eulogy. Hitler attended and placed Heydrich's decorations—including the highest grade of the German Order, the Blood Order Medal, the Wound Badge in Gold, and the War Merit Cross 1st Class with Swords—on his funeral pillow. Although Heydrich's death was employed for pro-Reich propaganda, Hitler privately blamed Heydrich for his own death through carelessness:

Since it is opportunity which makes not only the thief but also the assassin, such heroic gestures as driving in an open, unarmoured vehicle or walking about the streets unguarded are just damned stupidity, which serves the Fatherland not one whit. That a man as irreplaceable as Heydrich should expose himself to unnecessary danger, I can only condemn as stupid and idiotic.

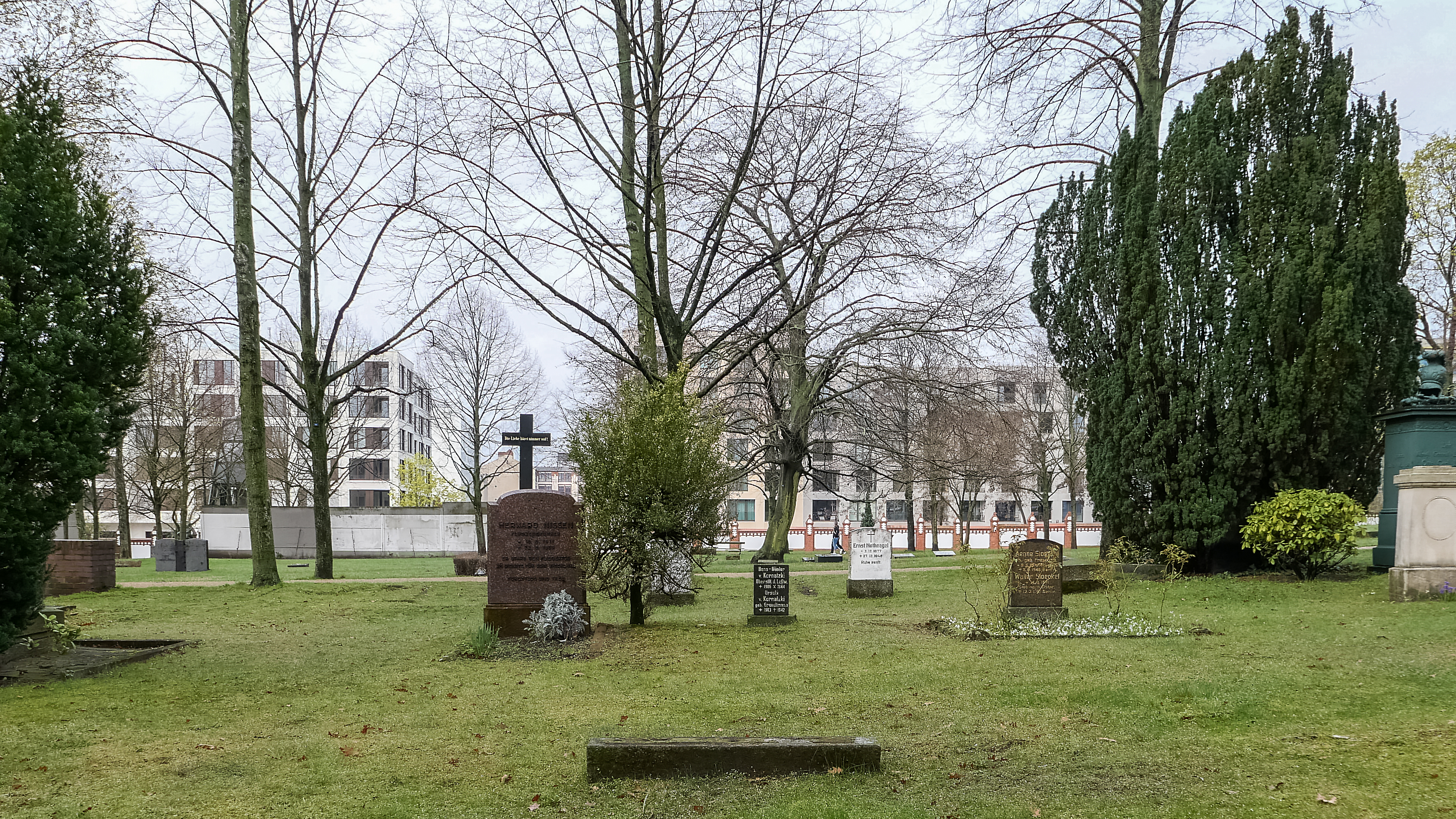
Heydrich's anonymous grave

Heydrich was interred in Berlin's Invalidenfriedhof, a military cemetery. The exact burial spot is no longer public knowledge—a temporary wooden marker that disappeared when the Red Army overran the city in 1945 was never replaced, so that Heydrich's grave could not become a rallying point for Neo-Nazis. Nevertheless, on 16 December 2019, the BBC reported that Heydrich's unmarked grave had been opened by unknown persons, without anything being taken. A photograph of Heydrich's burial shows the wreaths and mourners to be in section A, which abuts the north wall of the Invalidenfriedhof and Scharnhorststraße, at the front of the cemetery. A recent biography of Heydrich also places the grave in Section A. Hitler planned for Heydrich to have a monumental tomb (designed by sculptor Arno Breker and architect Wilhelm Kreis) but, due to Germany's declining fortunes, it was never built.

Heydrich's widow, Lina, won the right to a pension following a series of court cases against the West German government in 1956 and 1959. She was declared entitled to a substantial pension as her husband was a German general killed in action. The government had previously declined to pay due to Heydrich's role in the Holocaust. The couple had four children: Klaus, born in 1933, killed in a traffic accident in 1943; Heider, born in 1934; Silke, born in 1939; and Marte, born shortly after her father's death in 1942. Lina wrote a memoir, Leben mit einem Kriegsverbrecher (Living With a War Criminal), which was published in 1976. She remarried once and died in 1985.

=== Aftermath ===
Heydrich's assailants hid in safe houses and eventually took refuge in Saints Cyril and Methodius Cathedral, an Orthodox church in Prague. After a traitor in the Czech resistance betrayed their location, the church was surrounded by 800 members of the SS and Gestapo. Several Czechs were killed, and the remainder hid in the church's crypt. The Germans attempted to flush the men out with gunfire and tear gas, and by flooding the crypt. Eventually an entrance was made using explosives. Rather than surrender, the soldiers killed themselves. Supporters of the assassins who were killed in the wake of these events included the church's leader, Bishop Gorazd, who is now revered as a martyr of the Orthodox Church.

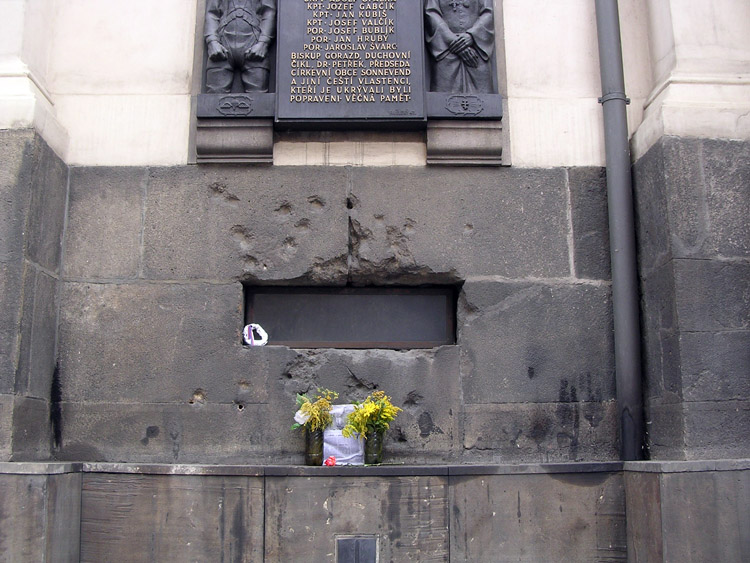
Bullet-scarred window to the crypt of Saints Cyril and Methodius Cathedral in Prague, where Kubiš and his compatriots were cornered

Infuriated by Heydrich's death, Hitler ordered the arrest and execution of 10,000 randomly selected Czechs. But after consultations with Karl Hermann Frank, he altered his response. The Czech lands were an important industrial zone for the German military, and indiscriminate killing could reduce the region's productivity. Hitler ordered a quick investigation. Intelligence falsely linked the assassins to the villages of Lidice and Ležáky. A Gestapo report stated that Lidice, 22 kilometres (14 mi) north-west of Prague, was suspected as the assailants' hiding place because several Czech army officers, then in England, had come from there; additionally, the Gestapo had found a resistance radio transmitter in Ležáky. On 9 June, after discussions with Himmler and Karl Hermann Frank, Hitler ordered brutal reprisals. In accordance with this order, the village of Lidice was destroyed and 172 boys and men between age 14 and 84 were shot. Thereafter, all adults in Ležáky were murdered on 24 June.

All but four of the women from Lidice were deported immediately to Ravensbrück concentration camp (four were pregnant – they were subjected to forced abortions at the same hospital where Heydrich had died and the women were then sent to the concentration camp). Some children were chosen for Germanization, and 81 were murdered in gas vans at the Chełmno extermination camp. Both towns were burned and Lidice's ruins were levelled. Overall, at least 1,300 Czechs, including 200 women, were killed in reprisal for Heydrich's assassination.

Heydrich's replacements were Ernst Kaltenbrunner as the chief of RSHA, and Karl Hermann Frank (27–28 May 1942) and Kurt Daluege (28 May 1942 – 14 October 1943) as the new Deputy Protector. After Heydrich's death, implementation of the policies formalised at the Wannsee conference he chaired was accelerated. The first three true death camps, designed for mass murder with no legal process or pretext, were built and operated at Treblinka, Sobibór, and Bełżec. The project was named Operation Reinhard after Heydrich.

== Service record ==
Heydrich's time in the SS was a mixture of rapid promotions, reserve commissions in the regular armed forces, and front-line combat service. During his 11 years with the SS Heydrich "rose from the ranks" and was appointed to every rank from private to full general. He was also a major in the Luftwaffe, flying nearly 100 combat missions until 22 July 1941, when his plane was hit by Soviet anti-aircraft fire. After this, Hitler personally ordered Heydrich to return to Berlin to resume his SS duties. His service record also gives him credit as a Navy Reserve Lieutenant, but in 1931 he was dismissed for conduct unbecoming an officer with loss of rank, and during World War II he had no contact with the Navy Reserve.

Heydrich began training as a pilot in 1935, and undertook fighter pilot training at the flight school at Werneuchen in 1939. Himmler initially forbade Heydrich from flying combat missions, but later relented, allowing him to join Jagdgeschwader 77 "Herz As" (Ace of Hearts) in Norway, where he was stationed from 15 April 1940 during Operation Weserübung. He returned to Berlin on 14 May after his plane crashed at Stavanger the previous day. While in Norway, Heydrich also organised the arrests of political opponents and arranged for a contingent of 200 SiPo and SD men to be stationed in several major cities.

On 20 July 1941, without seeking authorisation from Himmler, Heydrich rejoined Jagdgeschwader 77 during Operation Barbarossa, arriving at Yampil, Vinnytsia Oblast in a borrowed Bf 109. His aircraft was hit by Soviet flak in action near the Dniester on 22 July, and he had to land the plane in enemy territory. He avoided capture and returned to Berlin after being rescued by a patrol. It was his final combat mission.

Heydrich received a number of Nazi and military awards. These included the German Order, Blood Order, Golden Party Badge, Luftwaffe Pilot's Badge, bronze and silver Front Flying Clasp of the Luftwaffe for combat missions, and the Iron Cross First and Second Classes.

== See also ==
- Dramatic portrayals of Reinhard Heydrich
- Glossary of Nazi Germany
- List of Nazi Party leaders and officials
- Lists of political office-holders in the Protectorate of Bohemia and Moravia
- List of SS-Obergruppenführer

== Bibliography ==
- Arad, Yitzhak (1987). Belzec, Sobibor, Treblinka: The Operation Reinhard Death Camps. Bloomington: Indiana University Press. ISBN 978-0-253-34293-5.
- BBC (16 December 2019). "Grave of top Nazi leader Reinhard Heydrich opened in Berlin". BBC.com. Archived from the original on 24 December 2019.
- Blandford, Edmund L. (2001). SS Intelligence: The Nazi Secret Service. Edison, NJ: Castle Books. ISBN 0-7858-1398-5.
- Bracher, Karl Dietrich (1970). The German Dictatorship: The Origins, Structure, and Effects of National Socialism. New York: Praeger. ISBN 978-1-12563-479-0.
- Browder, George C. (2004). Foundations of the Nazi Police State: The Formation of Sipo and SD. Lexington: University Press of Kentucky. ISBN 978-0-8131-1697-6.
- Browning, Christopher R. (2004). The Origins of the Final Solution: The Evolution of Nazi Jewish Policy, September 1939 – March 1942. Comprehensive History of the Holocaust. Lincoln: University of Nebraska Press. ISBN 0-8032-1327-1.
- Bryant, Chad Carl (2007). Prague in Black: Nazi Rule and Czech Nationalism. Cambridge, MA: Harvard University Press. ISBN 978-0-674-02451-9.
- Burian, Michal; Knížek, Aleš; Rajlich, Jiří; Stehlík, Eduard (2002). Assassination: Operation Anthropoid, 1941–1942 (PDF). Prague: Ministry of Defence of the Czech Republic – AVIS. ISBN 978-80-7278-158-4. Archived (PDF) from the original on 1 December 2016.
- Calic, Edouard (1985) [1982]. Reinhard Heydrich: The Chilling Story of the Man Who Masterminded the Nazi Death Camps. New York: Morrow. ISBN 978-0-688-00481-1.
- Conquest, Robert (2008) [1990]. The Great Terror: A Reassessment. Oxford: Oxford University Press. ISBN 978-0-19-531700-8.
- Craig, John S. (2005). Peculiar Liaisons: In War, Espionage, and Terrorism in the Twentieth Century. New York: Algora. ISBN 978-0-87586-331-3.
- Dederichs, Mario R. (2009) [2005]. Heydrich: The Face of Evil. Drexel Hill, PA: Casemate. ISBN 978-1-935149-12-5.
- Defalque, R. J.; Wright, A. J. (January 2009). "The Puzzling Death of Reinhard Heydrich" (PDF). Bulletin of Anesthesia History. 27 (1). Pittsburgh PA: Anesthesia History Association and Wood-Library Museum of Anesthesiology: 1, 4–7. doi:10.1016/S1522-8649(09)50001-7. PMID 20506755. Archived from the original (PDF) on 31 October 2014.
- Delarue, Jacques (2008) [1962]. The Gestapo: A History of Horror. New York: Skyhorse. ISBN 978-1-60239-246-5.
- Donnelley, Paul (2012). Assassination!. United Kingdom: Lulu Publishing. ISBN 978-1-908963-03-1.
- Evans, Richard J. (2005). The Third Reich in Power. New York: Penguin Group. ISBN 978-0-14-303790-3.
- Evans, Richard J. (2008). The Third Reich at War. New York: Penguin Books. ISBN 978-0-14-311671-4.
- Flaherty, T. H. (2004) [1988]. The Third Reich: The SS. Time-Life Books. ISBN 978-1-84447-073-0.
- Frucht, Richard C. (2005). Eastern Europe: An Introduction to the People, Lands, and Culture. Santa Barbara, CA: ABC-CLIO. ISBN 978-1-57607-800-6.
- Garrett, Stephen (1996). Conscience and Power: An Examination of Dirty Hands and Political Leadership. New York: St Martin's Press. ISBN 978-0-312-15908-5.
- Gerwarth, Robert (2011). Hitler's Hangman: The Life of Heydrich. New Haven, CT: Yale University Press. ISBN 978-0-300-11575-8.
- Gerwarth, Robert (2011). Reinhard Heydrich. Biographie (in German). München: Siedler.
- Goldhagen, Daniel Jonah (1996). Hitler's Willing Executioners: Ordinary Germans and the Holocaust. New York: Knopf. ISBN 978-0-679-44695-8.
- Headland, Ronald (1992). Messages of Murder: A Study of the Reports of the Einsatzgruppen of the Security Police and the Security Service, 1941–1943. Rutherford, NJ: Fairleigh Dickinson University Press. ISBN 978-0-8386-3418-9.
- Hilberg, Raul (1985). The Destruction of the European Jews. New York & London: Homles & Meier. ISBN 0-8419-0910-5.
- Hillgruber, Andreas (1989). "War in the East and the Extermination of the Jews". In Marrus, Michael (ed.). The 'Final Solution': The Implementation of Mass Murder. The Nazi Holocaust, Part 3. Vol. 1. Westpoint, CT: Mecler. ISBN 978-0-88736-255-2.
- Höhne, Heinz (2000) [1969]. The Order of the Death's Head: The Story of Hitler's SS. London: Penguin. ISBN 978-0-14-139012-3.
- Horvitz, Leslie Alan; Catherwood, Christopher (2006). Encyclopedia of War Crimes and Genocide. New York: Facts on File. ISBN 978-0-8160-6001-6.
- Kershaw, Ian (2000). Hitler: 1936–45: Nemesis. New York: W. W. Norton & Company. ISBN 978-0-393-04994-7.
- Kershaw, Ian (2008). Hitler: A Biography. New York: W.W. Norton & Co. ISBN 978-0-393-06757-6.
- Kitchen, Martin (1995). Nazi Germany at War. New York: Longman. ISBN 0-582-07387-1.
- Lehrer, Steven (2000). Wannsee House and the Holocaust. Jefferson, NC: McFarland. ISBN 978-0-7864-0792-7.
- Longerich, Peter (2012). Heinrich Himmler: A Life. Oxford: Oxford University Press. ISBN 978-0-19-959232-6.
- MacDonald, Callum (1989). The Killing of Reinhard Heydrich: The SS 'Butcher of Prague'. Boston: Da Capo Press. ISBN 978-0-306-80860-9.
- MacDonald, Callum (1998) [1989]. The Killing of Reinhard Heydrich: The SS 'Butcher of Prague'. Boston: Da Capo Press. ISBN 978-0-306-80860-9.
- McNab, Chris (2009). The SS: 1923–1945. London: Amber Books. ISBN 978-1-906626-48-8.
- Merriam Webster's Collegiate Dictionary (Tenth ed.). Springfield, MA: Merriam-Webster. 1996. ISBN 0-87779-709-9.
- Miller, Michael D.; Schulz, Andreas (2015). Leaders of the SS & German Police. Vol. 2 Reichsführer SS – Gruppenführer (Hans Haltermann to Walter Kruger). R. James Bender Publishing. ISBN 978-1-932-97025-8.
- Paces, Cynthia (2009). Prague Panoramas: National Memory and Sacred Space in the Twentieth Century. Pittsburgh: University of Pittsburgh Press. ISBN 978-0-8229-6035-5.
- Padfield, Peter (1990). Himmler: Reichsführer SS. New York: Henry Holt. ISBN 0-8050-2699-1.
- Ramen, Fred (2001). Reinhard Heydrich: Hangman of the Third Reich. New York: Rosen. ISBN 978-0-8239-3379-2.
- Reitlinger, Gerald (1989) [1956]. The SS: Alibi of a Nation 1922–1945. Boston: Da Capo Press. ISBN 978-0-306-80351-2.
- Rhodes, Richard (2002). Masters of Death: The SS-Einsatzgruppen and the Invention of the Holocaust. New York: Vintage Books. ISBN 0-375-70822-7.
- Roberts, Andrew Lawrence (2005). From Good King Wenceslas to the Good Soldier: A Dictionary of Czech Popular Culture. Central European University Press. ISBN 978-963-7326-26-4.
- Semerdjiev, Stefan (10 June 2019). "Reinhard Heydrich: A Devil With Many Faces". Historynet. Archived from the original on 8 March 2022.
- Sereny, Gitta (1996) [1995]. Albert Speer: His Battle With Truth. New York: Vintage. ISBN 978-0-679-76812-8.
- Shirer, William L. (1960). The Rise and Fall of the Third Reich. New York: Simon & Schuster. LCCN 60-6729.
- Snyder, Louis (1994) [1976]. Encyclopedia of the Third Reich. Boston: Da Capo Press. ISBN 978-1-56924-917-8.
- Steigmann-Gall, Richard (2003). The Holy Reich: Nazi Conceptions of Christianity, 1919–1945. Cambridge: Cambridge University Press. ISBN 978-0-521-82371-5.
- Waite, Robert George Leeson (1969) [1952]. Vanguard of Nazism: The Free Corps Movement in Postwar Germany, 1918–1923. New York: W.W. Norton & Co. ISBN 978-0-393-00181-5.
- Weale, Adrian (2010). The SS: A New History. London: Little, Brown. ISBN 978-1408703045.
- Weisz, George M.; Albury, William R. (4 April 2014). "The Attempt on the Life of Reinhard Heydrich, Architect of the 'Final Solution': A Review of his Treatment and Autopsy" (PDF). IMAJ. 16 (4): 212–216. PMID 24834756. Archived (PDF) from the original on 20 June 2023.
- Williams, Max (2001). Reinhard Heydrich: The Biography, Volume 1 – Road To War. Church Stretton: Ulric Publishing. ISBN 978-0-9537577-5-6.
- Williams, Max (2003). Reinhard Heydrich: The Biography, Volume 2 – Enigma. Church Stretton: Ulric Publishing. ISBN 978-0-9537577-6-3.

Government offices
Preceded by Konstantin von Neurath	Deputy Protector of Bohemia and Moravia; 29 September 1941 – 4 June 1942	Succeeded by Kurt Daluege
Preceded by Otto Steinhäusl	President of the ICPC; 24 August 1940 – 4 June 1942	Succeeded by Arthur Nebe
New title	Director of the Reich Security Main Office; 27 September 1939 – 4 June 1942	Succeeded by Heinrich Himmler; Acting
Preceded by Rudolf Diels	Director of the Gestapo; 22 April 1934 – 27 September 1939	Succeeded by Heinrich Müller
Awards and achievements
Preceded by Boris Shaposhnikov	Cover of Time Magazine; 23 February 1942	Succeeded by Tomoyuki Yamashita
