= Alfred Biliotti =

British archaeologist and diplomat (1833–1915)

Sir Alfred Biliotti KCMG CB
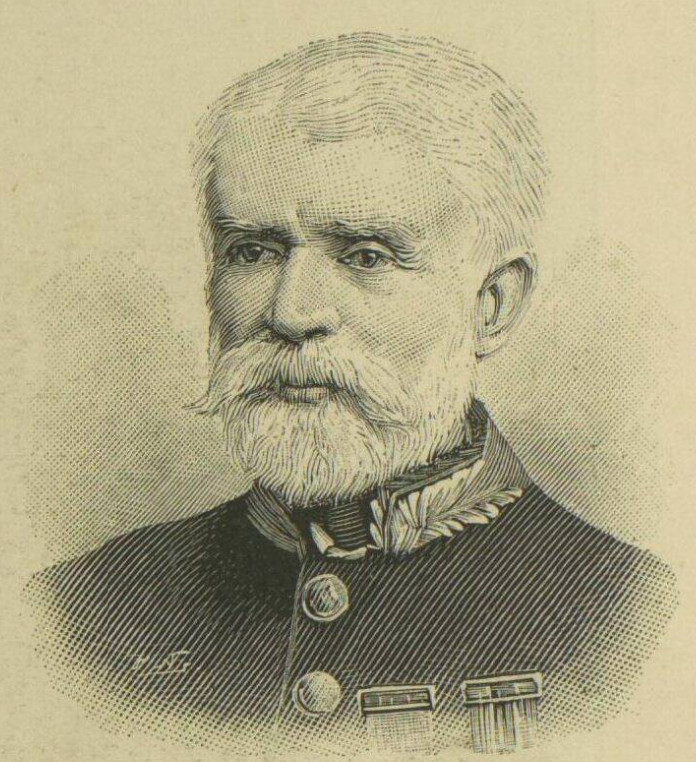
- Portrayed in The Illustrated London News, 1897
- Born: 14 July 1833; Rhodes, Rhodes, Ottoman Empire
- Died: 1 February 1915 (aged 81)
- Citizenship: British (from 1871)
- Spouse: Marguerite (m. 1889)
- Children: 1 (Emile)
- Awards: Companion of the Order of St Michael and St George (1886); Companion of the Order of the Bath (1890)

Sir Alfred Biliotti KCMG CB (14 July 1833 – 1 February 1915) was a Levantine Italian, born on Rhodes, who became a British consular official and amateur archaeologist. Biliotti probably received little formal education, and followed his father, who had carried out consular work for the governments of Britain, Spain and Tuscany, into the British consular service in 1849. He accompanied Charles Newton, an archaeologist then working for the British Foreign Service, on an archaeological tour in 1853, beginning a relationship of patronage by which Newton supported Biliotti in a twofold career, in the consulate and in archaeology.

After periods on Rhodes and at Trebizond, Biliotti was posted to Khania, the capital of Ottoman Crete, in 1885. There, he played a prominent role in the unrest and international interventions that marked the end of Ottoman rule, including the collapse of the Pact of Halepa in 1889 and the Cretan Revolt of 1897–1898. He reported the Lasithi massacres of 1897 and lobbied unsuccessfully for the pursuit and punishment of those responsible, investigated allegations of atrocities against both Christians and Muslims, and negotiated the evacuation of around 3,500 Muslims from a siege at Kandanos, gaining acclaim in the British press.

Biliotti acquired a dominant position in Cretan diplomatic circles, but was reassigned to Salonika in Macedonia in 1899, having gained the distrust of Prince George of Greece and figures in the British establishment, who accused him variously of sympathising with the Ottomans and of plotting against them. In Salonika, he again investigated alleged massacres of the Christian population. He retired on his seventieth birthday, in accordance with consular service regulations, in 1903.

Throughout his consular career, Biliotti carried out archaeological work, largely centred around the acquisition of objects for the British Museum. His excavations included, with Auguste Salzmann, the site of Kameiros on Rhodes, where he excavated over 300 graves of the archaic and classical periods; Ialysos, where he uncovered the first known examples of Mycenaean painted pottery; and the Roman legionary fortress at Satala near Trebizond. He also carried out minor archaeological work in Turkey and on Crete, and had a crocus, C. biliottii, named after him.

Biliotti was regarded as a competent and influential diplomat by contemporaries, and was frequently called upon by Lord Salisbury, the British prime minister, who had him knighted in 1896. He was friendly with Eleftherios Venizelos, later prime minister of Greece, and may have helped him flee Crete in 1889. His consular reports have widely been used by scholars of the period, though historians have also argued that Biliotti's negative view of Ottoman Muslims distorted his portrayal of them.

== Early life ==
Alfred Biliotti was born on 14 July 1833 in a Catholic family in Rhodes, capital of the eponymous island, then a loosely-controlled part of the Ottoman Empire. His father, Charles Biliotti, was a native of Livorno, then in the Italian Grand Duchy of Tuscany; his mother, Honorine (née Fleurat), was the daughter of George Fleurat, the French vice-consul on Rhodes. Charles had moved to Rhodes at some point before the 1820s, possibly during or in the aftermath of the Napoleonic Wars, (Note: Barchard 2006, p. 7. For the suggestion that Charles Biliotti moved during the Napoleonic Wars, see Kutbay 2014, p. 42.) and married Honorine in the 1830s. Alfred was the eldest of their seven children; by the time of his birth, Charles was a merchant on Rhodes who had worked for four years as an unpaid translator for the British consular service on the island. Charles stopped his work for the British around the time of Alfred's birth, though continued to perform sporadic consular work for the governments of Spain and Tuscany. Charles's brother Fortunato also served as a British consular agent on the island of Kastellorizo.

Charles Biliotti's business included work and property in the town of Makri, in the southwestern part of mainland Turkey. On 7 November 1845, Lawrence Jones, a British baronet, was robbed and murdered by brigands near the town; after both the British consulate and the Ottoman government failed to find those responsible, Charles worked with Ali Pasha, the kaymakam (district governor) of Makri, to catch them; they were arrested on 23 April 1846. (Note: In thanks for his service, the family of Lawrence Jones presented Charles Biliotti with a silver jug and cup; Alfred Biliotti listed these as his foremost possessions in his own will.) Following Ali Pasha's murder by relatives of the arrested men, Charles was forced to leave Makri and to abandon his business interests in the town; however, the affair reaffirmed the relationship between him and the British state, and he returned under British protection to Makri in March 1848 as Britain's vice-consul.

Alfred Biliotti was a Levantine Italian; a member of the Italian diaspora settled in the eastern Aegean. (Note: Barchard 2006, p. 8. On the term "Levantine Italian", see McGuire 2020, p. 93.) He may have been educated at a Christian school, possibly in the Ionian town of Ayvalık or in İzmir, but his biographer David Barchard considers it more likely that he never received any formal education, except via a tutor. He appears to have been taught French and a little English, and to have received the equivalent of a secondary school–level education.

== Diplomatic career ==
=== Early career ===
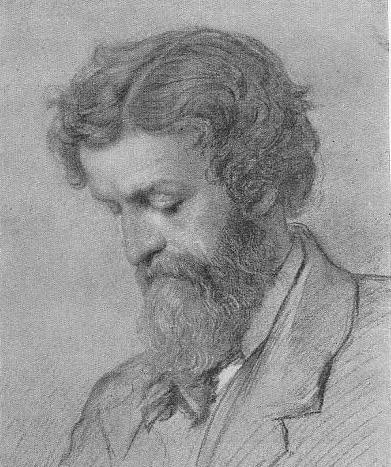
Portrait of Charles Newton, published in 1910

In 1849, at the age of sixteen, Biliotti took a post as a clerk to his father, the British vice-consul based at Makri. (Note: Gill 2004, p. 80; Barchard 2006, p. 10 (for Charles Biliotti as the Vice-Consul)) In 1850, he was made a dragoman (interpreter) (Note: The historian Keith Brown translates dragoman as "fixer".) at the British consulate on Rhodes; he is recorded from 1853 as making certified translations for the consulate from Greek into English.

Biliotti first met Charles Newton, an archaeologist then working for the Foreign Service, during the latter's posting to the eastern Aegean. In the spring of 1852, Newton was posted as a vice-consul to Mytilene on the island of Lesbos, though the consulate at Rhodes was instructed to facilitate Newton's archaeological work as a greater priority than any diplomatic duties of his role. Newton's main task was to find archaeological finds and acquire them for British museum collections, and to identify local agents to supervise exploratory excavations. In 1853, he was promoted to the role of consul on Rhodes. (Note: Barchard 2006, p. 11. According to Salmon, Newton held the consul's role in an acting capacity.) In June of the same year, he travelled to the island of Chios with the historian George Finlay and Biliotti, then aged nineteen. Barchard credits Newton's patronage of Biliotti with allowing the latter to advance to prominence in the consular service, despite his lack of educational qualifications.

On 24 January 1856, Biliotti became vice-consul on Rhodes. The position was unpaid, as were most other British consular posts: they were generally assumed to be part-time positions whose holders would support themselves by other commercial activities. From 15 February until 12 April 1860, and again from 15 February to 12 April 1861, he held the position of acting consul. He was taken on as a paid vice-consul on 26 August 1863, and became a naturalised British citizen on 23 October 1871.

In 1873 or 1874, Biliotti was made vice-consul at Trebizond: the historian Lucia Patrizio Gunning has written that this move was intended to facilitate his archaeological work at the nearby site of Satala. (Note: Gunning 2022, p. 226. Gill gives the year as 1873. Mitford writes that Biliotti was in post by the time of his arrival at Satala at the end of August 1874.) Though his predecessor, Gifford Palgrave, had held the post of consul, Biliotti was kept at the lower rank of vice-consul and paid £200 per year (equivalent to £19,553.7 in 2025) less in annual salary. In November 1878, following an intimation from the Foreign Secretary, Lord Salisbury, that he was considering transferring Biliotti to Diyarbakir in eastern Turkey, Biliotti wrote in protest to Austen Henry Layard, the British ambassador to the Ottoman Empire, and successfully did away with the proposal.

Biliotti was promoted to consul in 1879; his father died at the end of May in the same year, and Biliotti wrote repeatedly to Salisbury to request a transfer to Crete. This request was not yet granted, though Biliotti was given additional responsibility for the consulate at Sivas in 1882. He was, however, paid less than other British consular officials and the representatives of other powers in Trebizond: in 1881, Biliotti received £400 per year (equivalent to £42,051 in 2025) and £160 (equivalent to £16,820 in 2025) in expenses, while his predecessor had been paid £600 per year and £200 in expenses in 1871 and his French counterpart was paid £1,250 (equivalent to £131,409 in 2025) per year. From Trebizond, he sent crocus specimens to the botanist George Maw, who named one species, C. biliottii, after him in 1886.

=== Crete ===
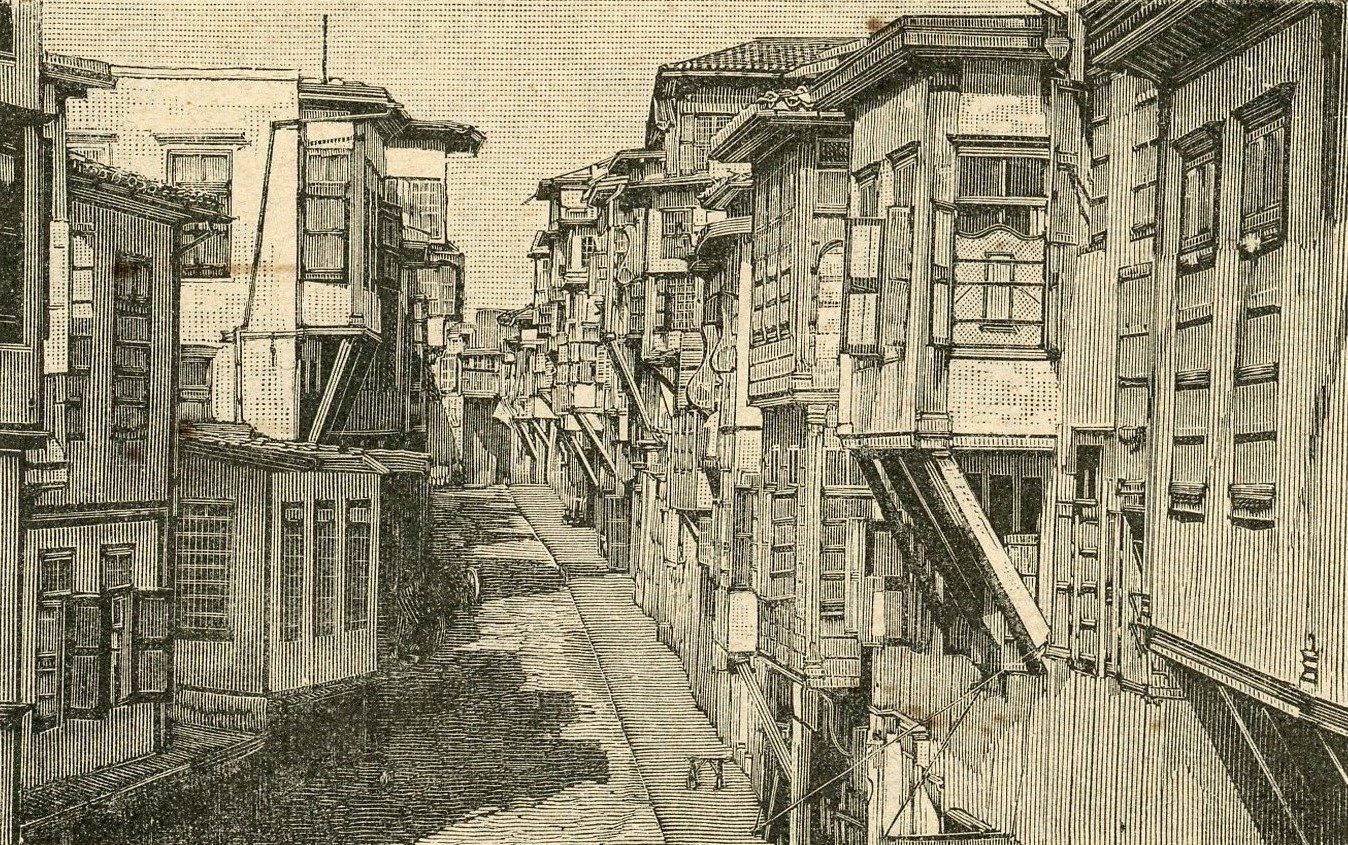
An 1890 woodcut of a street in Khania, where Biliotti was based as consul on Crete

In 1885, Biliotti succeeded Thomas Backhouse Sandwith as consul on Crete, based at Khania. He was made consul-general on the island in 1897. (Note: Barchard 2006, p. 21. Gill gives the year as 1899.) In 1900, the French diplomat and philhellene Victor Bérard alleged that Biliotti's appointment to the post in Khania had been a reward for his "obscure but useful" services in acquiring antiquities for the British Museum. (Note: See § Archaeological work below.) According to Esmé Howard, who served as consul-general there in the early twentieth century, Biliotti ended a problem of frivolous lawsuits raised by the island's Maltese community by requiring parties to a case to place money in deposit before it could be heard. (Note: Barchard 2006, p. 21. Barchard suggests that this account may have been "consular folklore".)

The Cretan consulate was, in common with the consular delegations of most other Great Powers, marked by infighting and ineffective co-operation. The consuls of other nations accused Biliotti of supporting anti-Ottoman rebellion and fomenting his own secret plots; he in turn accused them of working against him. Bérard wrote in 1898 that what he called the "Biliotti Question" was the main problem confronting Crete.

==== Collapse of the Pact of Halepa, 1889 ====
Since 1878, Crete had been administered according to the Pact of Halepa, which had been negotiated by the Ottoman Empire with Greek rebels on the island. Under the Pact, Crete was treated as a semi-autonomous province, and Christians were given a privileged position: they had preferential treatment in applying for official posts, a guaranteed majority in the island's governing assembly, and the right to found newspapers and intellectual societies. Greek was also made an official language of the island. (Note: MacGillivray 2000, p. 88; Mylonakis 2023, p. 99. For the terms of the Pact of Halepa, see Miller 1934, pp. 418–419.)

Following the legislative elections of April 1889, which were won by the reformist, liberal xypolitoi ('barefoot') party, the defeated conservative faction held demonstrations calling for union with Greece (enosis). In response, the Ottoman government imposed martial law. In December, the Ottoman government abrogated the terms of the Pact of Halepa and reimposed direct rule, under the governor Shakir Pasha. The Cretan politician Eleftherios Venizelos, later prime minister of Greece, was a friend of Biliotti's and has sometimes been described as his protégé. Venizelos fled Crete for mainland Greece around the end of September, fearing Ottoman reprisals; Biliotti may have lent him the rowing-boat he used in his escape. In July 1889, the Ottomans stationed around 20,000 soldiers on the island. Cretan Christians protested, and accused the soldiers of various crimes and abuses of power. (Note: During the time period of this article, Crete used the Julian Calendar, which was twelve days behind the Gregorian Calendar used throughout most of Europe. This article uses the Gregorian dates throughout.) Biliotti established an enquiry to verify accusations of massacres made in Greek newspapers, and found that, while the stories were generally false or vastly exaggerated, 50 Christians and 42 Muslims had been killed, 115 Christian schools, 57 mosques, 37 Muslim schools and 14 churches had been destroyed, and 6,640 other Muslim-owned buildings and 2,456 Christian-owned ones had been vandalised. In the years that followed, the Christian population largely refused to co-operate with the Ottoman government, effectively making the island ungovernable.

==== Cretan Revolt of 1896–1898 ====
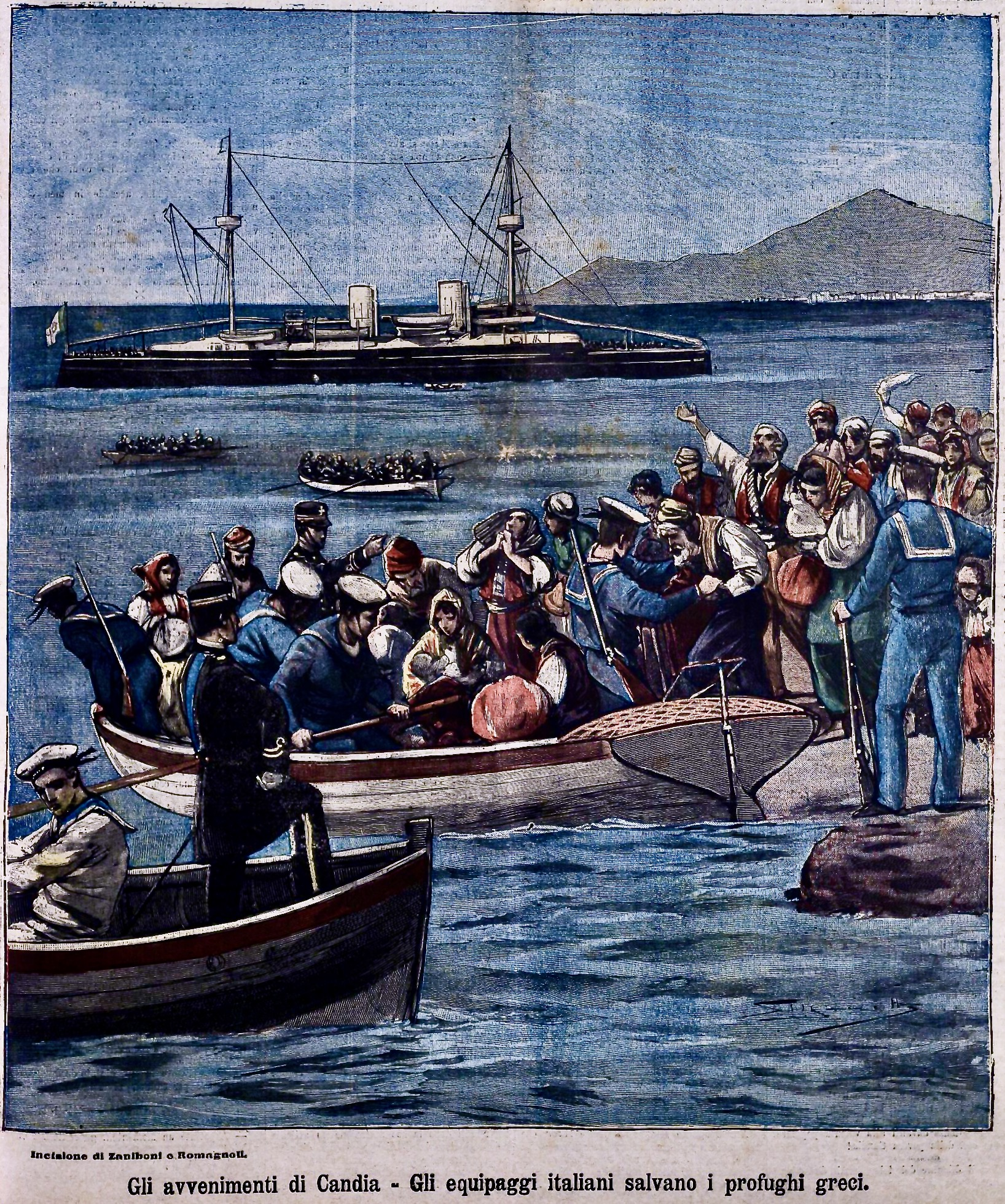
An Italian newspaper illustration from February 1897, showing Greek refugees boarding Italian warships at Candia

From 1895, violence between Crete's Christians and Muslims increased. Lord Salisbury, the British prime minister and foreign secretary, proposed that Biliotti could act as an intermediary between the Ottoman government and the rebels. One insurrectionist, Manoussos Koundouros, who took up arms in September 1895, had previously been a mentee of Biliotti's; Biliotti had earlier encouraged the Ottoman governor to pay for Koundouros to be educated in Athens. The connection led the Ottoman state to hold Biliotti responsible for the outbreak of rebellion.

On 24 May 1896, street fighting broke out in Khania on the Muslim festival of Eid al-Adha: Muslims from the countryside had gathered in the town, both for the celebration and to protect themselves from violence. By that evening, Christians and Muslims had erected barricades in the streets and began shooting at each other: Biliotti requested that a warship of the Royal Navy be sent immediately to restore order. The fighting escalated into riots by bands of Muslims and further fighting in the surrounding countryside; in response, armed Christian volunteers crossed from the Greek mainland. Biliotti visited the worst-affected areas of Khania, in the company of Orthodox priests, to attempt to calm the situation, and arranged for displaced Muslim families to be billeted in houses left behind by Christian refugees, thousands of whom had fled to mainland Greece or other Cretan towns. Other nations' consuls made similar requests to their governments for help, and a British-led coalition imposed a new constitution upon Crete in August 1896.

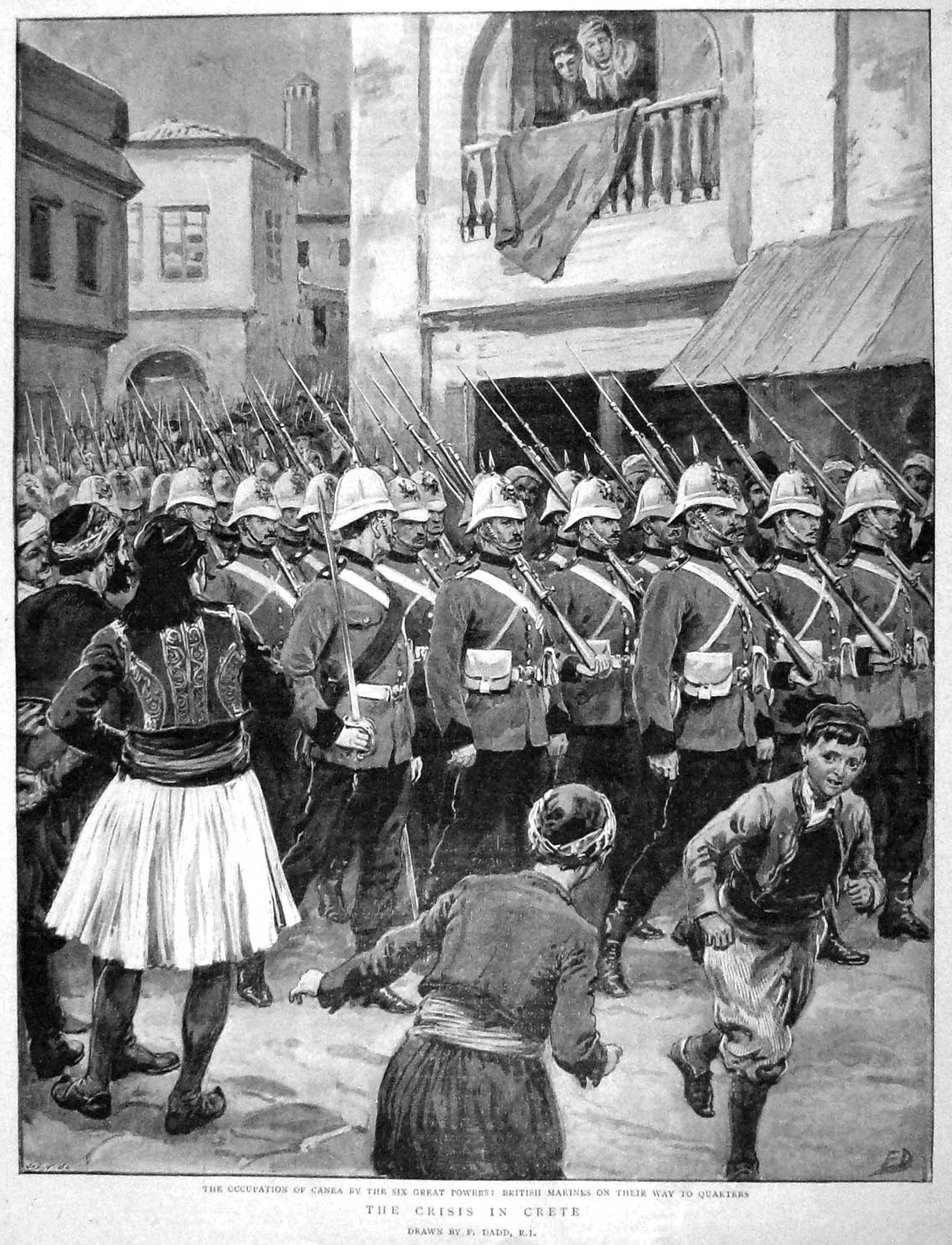
British Royal Marines march through Khania, as depicted in The Graphic on 6 March 1897

Within a year, open rebellion against Ottoman rule broke out. Greek troops landed on the island in January 1897 and handed weapons to Christian villagers, whom they instructed to use them to kill Muslim civilians. Violence intensified in Khania's Christian neighbourhoods from 19 January; on 3 February, the Ottoman governor, George Berovich Pasha, asked the consuls for assistance in calming the situation. Unrest escalated on 5 February; Biliotti reported to his superiors that day that a massacre was taking place, and that Khania was "burning". In response, the battleship HMS Barfleur was sent to fight the fire and restore order. Meanwhile, in the eastern part of the island around Lasithi, in the French zone of occupation, around 1,000 people were killed by Greek rioters; the British Vice-Consul in Candia, Lysimachos Kalokairinos, tried to cover up the murders, though Biliotti established that they had indeed happened. Greek Cretan rebels proclaimed the island's independence the same month; a short war ensued between Greece and the Ottoman Empire. Britain and the other Great Powers opposed the action, and Robert Hastings Harris, an admiral of the Royal Navy, was sent to calm the situation. Harris distrusted Biliotti, and generally bypassed him in his communications and decision-marking.

Early in March 1897, an Anglo-French military expedition was sent by sea from Khania to relieve the siege of Kandanos in south-western Crete, where around 3,000 Muslim civilians and several hundred Ottoman soldiers were facing imminent massacre by Christian insurrectionists. Biliotti was the only one of the foreign consuls, who were invited to accompany the expedition at two hours' notice, to go: he negotiated the safe passage of the Muslims inside Kandanos with their Christian opponents, promising the latter that Crete was to be given self-government and that the European powers would see to the end of effective Ottoman rule. He also promised the Christians that the Muslims would emigrate, allowing the Christians to seize their property. (Note: The historian Uğur Peçe has judged that this promise, while effective in defusing the short-term confrontation, "helped tear up ... the bi-religious fabric" of rural Crete.) In total, 2,047 Muslim civilians and 594 soldiers were evacuated, though some Muslims were wounded in exchanges of fire between European soldiers and Christian rebels and left behind. On 11 March, the Moslem Patriotic League, a society of British Muslims, passed a motion thanking Biliotti for his service at Kandanos. Biliotti was credited in Punch magazine with saving "by his personal exertions many thousand Moslem lives".

In the midst of the strife
And war to the knife
O'er a question fierce and knotty
Let us sing to the praise
'Mid the death-strewn maze
Of Sir Alfred Biliotti
No craven was he
Who could put to sea
Saving thousands by pluck and daring
Let King George have his say
But we'll cheer the way
Of our consul's overbearing!

— Published in Punch magazine, 20 March 1897.

The war between Greece and the Ottomans, largely fought in Thessaly and Epirus, ended with a Greek defeat in May. In December 1897, a joint British, French, Russian, Austro-Hungarian, German and Italian force occupied Crete; the following year, they appointed Prince George of Greece as High Commissioner of the newly-established, largely autonomous Cretan State, effectively ending Ottoman control of the island. Biliotti urged the swift formation of a new government, believing that the island's population would be impoverished beyond remedy if this were not done within a year.

In April 1898, Austria-Hungary and Germany withdrew their troops; the governance of Crete was subsequently reorganised, with the admirals of the four remaining powers' naval contingents forming a council, and each nation administering a sector of the island. Biliotti wrote to Salisbury on 18 July, warning that this arrangement would not be adequate to maintain order: on 6 September, violence broke out once again, after the admirals, against Biliotti's advice, sent troops of the Highland Light Infantry to install Christian administrators as tax collectors in Candia. (Note: Biliotti had previously, albeit unsuccessfully, attempted to broker a compromise whereby the Muslim clerks would be replaced in their posts by a Christian, but would continue to be paid their wages.) The events that transpired were disputed in the aftermath; the British troops were confronted by a large and mostly unarmed crowd of Muslim civilians, fire was exchanged, fourteen British troops were killed and forty wounded, while most of the town was burned down; between 500 and 700 Christian civilians were killed, including Kalokairinos, and the warship HMS Hazard fired on the town to allow British troops to escape. The official Turkish account was that the British troops had fired shots and charged the crowd with bayonets, and that the Muslims had then returned home to gather weapons. Biliotti, however, was sent along with a large international contingent of troops to Candia, and confirmed the testimony of the British commander, Francis Maude Reid, that the first shot had been fired by a British soldier who had been stabbed in the back. For most of the remainder of the year, Biliotti remained in Candia, largely berthed aboard HMS Camperdown.

In December 1898, Biliotti was tasked by Herbert Chermside, the commandant of the British sector of occupation, to persuade those Muslims who had left their homes in eastern Crete to return. Biliotti reported that most were unwilling to do so, and raised with Chermside the murders of February 1897 and the lack of punishment that had been visited on the perpetrators, though neither Chermside nor any of the occupying powers acted on his protest. On Biliotti's advice, however, the ambassadors of the Great Powers agreed to increase the amount of money to be loaned to the Cretan administration for reconstruction: having previously planned loans totalling 4,000,000 francs, they planned additional credit worth between 2,000,000 and 4,000,000 francs. (Note: Pritchard 2015, p. 70. Pritchard calculates that 4,000,000 francs was worth approximately £8,664,000 in 2015, equivalent to £11,967,992 in 2025.)

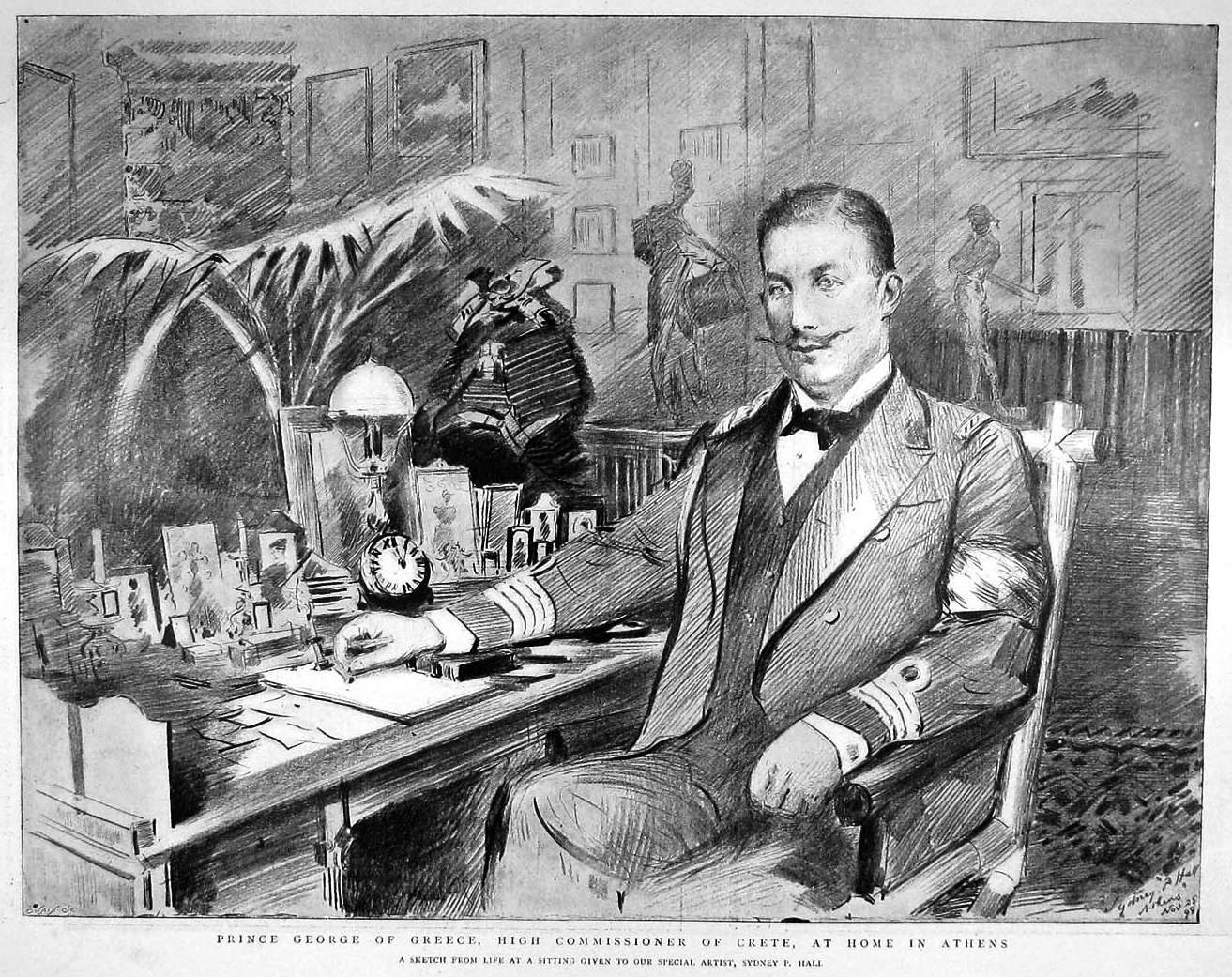
An 1898 portrait of Prince George of Greece, in his study as High Commissioner of Crete

During the unrest on Crete, Biliotti's colleagues accused him of conspiring against Ottoman rule; he in turn wrote in 1896 to Salisbury, accusing them of undermining his diplomatic work and of being unable to work effectively together. Nicholas Gennadis, from 1897 the Greek Royal Commissioner on Crete, portrayed Biliotti as an impediment to the Hellenisation of the island in his despatches to King George. Biliotti and Prince George had a poor relationship; Biliotti opposed George's intentions to establish Greeks as the dominant presence in Crete's administration, while both George and some of Biliotti's superiors viewed Biliotti as a "Turkophile". After what Michael Llewellyn-Smith has called a "painful interview" between Biliotti and George on 23 January, (Note: Llewellyn-Smith 2021, p. 104; for the date, Barchard 2006, p. 47.) the decision was taken to replace Biliotti with Robert Wyndham Graves, (Note: Llewellyn-Smith 2021, p. 104. On Graves, see Morray 2009.) who took up post on 1 May 1899.

=== Salonika ===
In March 1899, the Foreign Office transferred Biliotti to Salonika in Macedonia, then an Ottoman possession, as Consul-General: a more prestigious post, albeit one that came with a salary £200 (equivalent to £22,220 in 2025) lower than he had received at Khania. Biliotti was distrusted by the Ottoman government, who attempted unsuccessfully to block his appointment; in turn, he largely staffed the consulate's intelligence staff with Greeks.

During Biliotti's service in Salonika, it was a centre of Bulgarian unrest against the ruling Ottoman state. The Internal Macedonian Revolutionary Organization (IMRO), a secret revolutionary society, had been founded in the city in 1893; in 1903, the IMRO began to collaborate with other revolutionary organisations towards a revolt against the Ottomans. Biliotti, sharing the views of other European and American diplomats in the city, wrote to the Foreign Office on 14 February that he considered the imminent rebellion to be a cynical attempt by the Bulgarians to generate a humanitarian crisis and so to provoke intervention by other European powers; he later wrote, on 25 February and 9 March, of his intention to warn the Ottoman governor of the uprising.

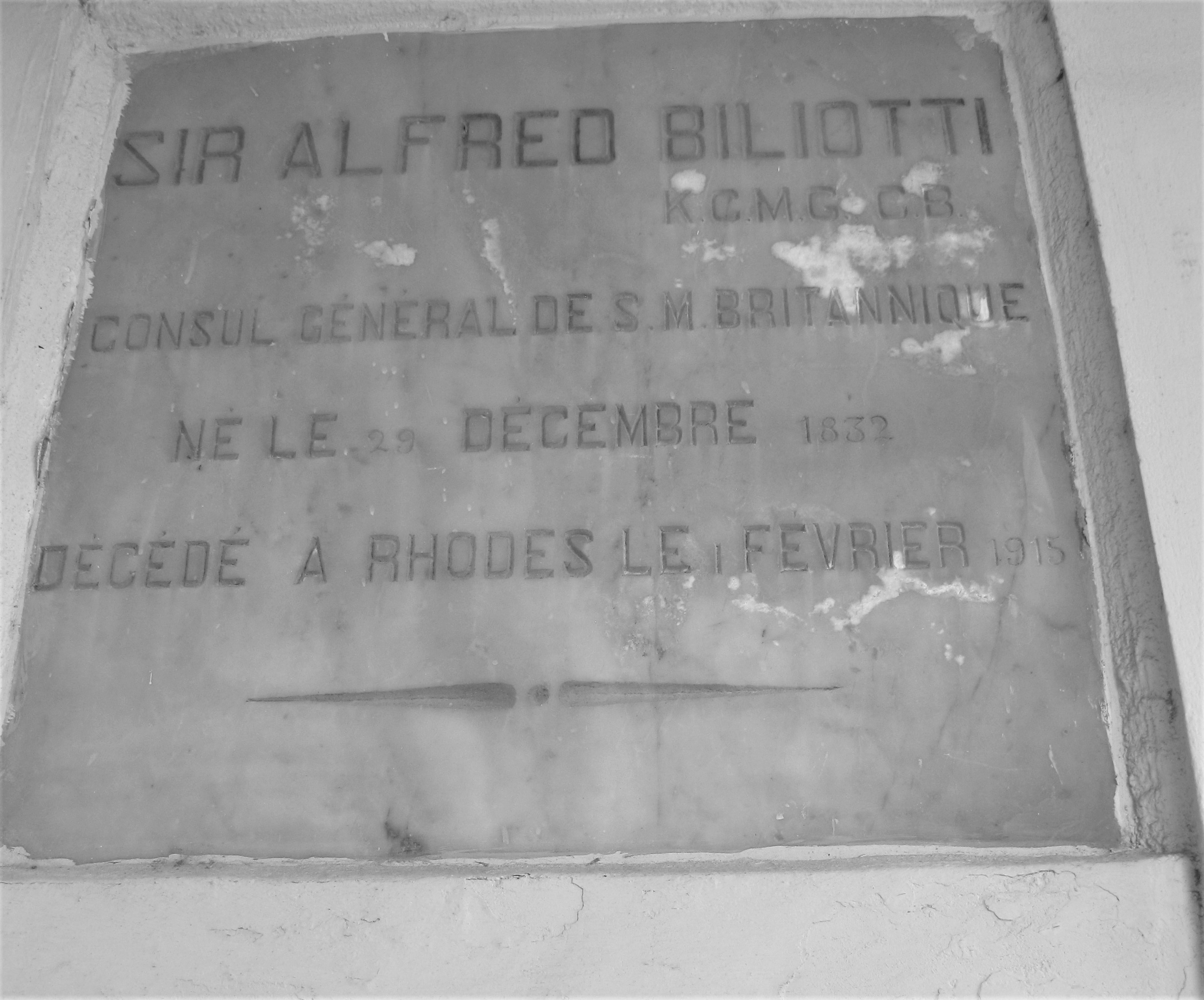
Biliotti's gravestone in the Catholic cemetery on Rhodes

Around the same time, while Biliotti was on leave in Crete, E. J. Dillon, a journalist with The Daily Telegraph, reported a massacre in Salonika in which he claimed that Turks had killed 3,000 people. On his return around the end of April, Biliotti investigated the reports and found them to be exaggerated; he established that around 50 people had died, and accused Dillon of fabricating Turkish atrocities to distract attention from the Macedonian rebels. The revolt Biliotti had predicted, known as the Ilinden Uprising, eventually broke out in August.

Biliotti retired on 14 July 1903, his seventieth birthday: seventy was the mandatory retirement age for British consular officials. As part of a wider reduction of its diplomatic corps in the Ottoman Empire, Britain closed its consular office in Rhodes in the same year. He received a monthly pension of £40 (equivalent to £4,205 in 2025) and spent most of his retirement in Rhodes, though he retained his house in Khania and regularly visited İzmir, a centre for Catholics in the region. Biliotti died on 1 February 1915, leaving what Barchard describes as a "relatively modest" estate of £1,107 (equivalent to £98,390 in 2025). He is buried, along with other members of his family, in the Catholic cemetery on Rhodes.

== Archaeological work ==
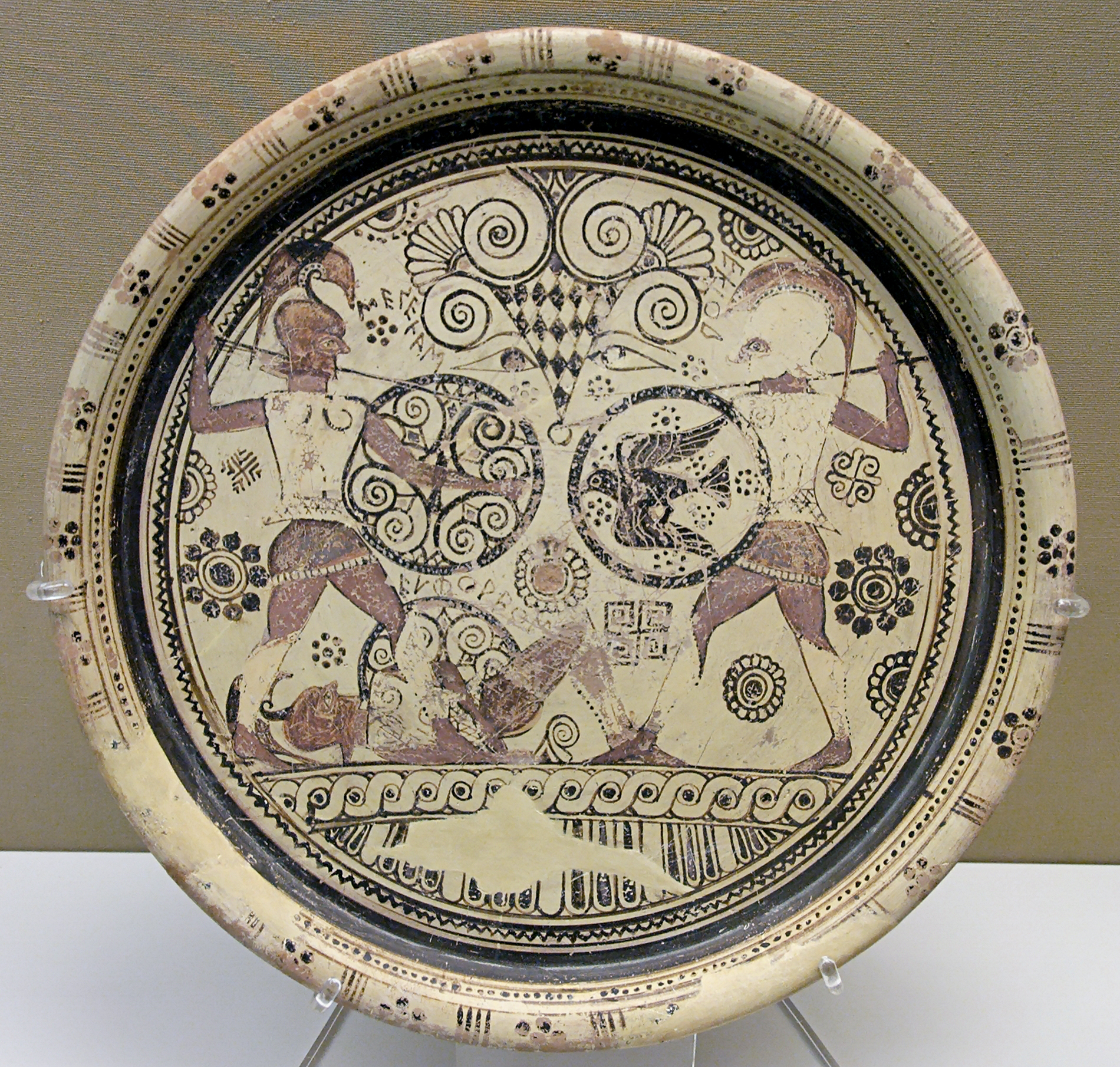
The Euphorbos plate, made around 600 BCE, discovered by Biliotti and Salzmann at Kameiros in 1859

Newton took on Biliotti as his protégé and trained him as an archaeologist from the time that the two first met in the early 1850s. In 1856, Biliotti conducted an impromptu excavation to rescue survivors from the Church of St John of the Collachium on Rhodes, which was destroyed on 6 November in an explosion after lightning struck gunpowder that had been stored in its cellars. (Note: Barchard 2006, p. 13. For the church's destruction, see Setton 1984, p. 208, and Harwig 1875, p. 279.) He never received formal archaeological education, apart from a period of three months in 1864, when he was funded by the British Museum to study archaeology and art history in Wiesbaden.

Barchard judges that Biliotti's archaeological work was the main locus of interest in him for his British superiors until the mid-1860s, though this situation reversed towards the end of that decade. Objects excavated by Biliotti form part of the collections of the British Museum, and at least eleven objects in the Fitzwilliam Museum of the University of Cambridge have been traced to his excavations of cemeteries on Rhodes. In total, the British Museum holds more than 3,000 objects excavated by Biliotti and his collaborator Auguste Salzmann from Rhodes.

In 1869, Biliotti visited Crete for the first recorded time, as a representative of the British Museum, which sent him to Ierapetra on the island's south coast to acquire two Roman statues, one of which is now known as the Hieraptyna Hadrian. The Ottoman authorities, however, refused to allow the statues' export, and reserved them for the Imperial Ottoman Museum in Constantinople. Between 1880 and 1883, by which point Biliotti had been reassigned to Trebizond, his brother Albert supervised on his behalf the excavation of over 500 tombs at the site of Kymissala on the south-western coast of the island. He may have undertaken further archaeological work on Rhodes in 1885, during a visit of several months, shortly after his assignment to Khania, which had the ostensible purpose of seeing Biliotti's mother.

During his time on Crete, Biliotti guided several British archaeologists around the island, including John Myres, who visited in the summer of 1893. (Note: Myres had previously intended to visit in 1899, and sought Biliotti's advice following the revolt of the same year: Biliotti initially advised that it was safe to travel, but later warned Myres off a few days before he was due to depart.) Biliotti attempted to secure for Myres a firman (permit) to excavate at the site of Knossos, but his request was denied by Mahmoud Pasha, the island's Ottoman governor, in December of that year. Biliotti wished unsuccessfully to excavate at the site of Gortyn, which was instead excavated from 1884 by what would later become the Italian School of Archaeology at Athens. In 1896, he made a plan of the site of Ephesus, earlier excavated by Newton, and sent it to Gerard Noel, a British aristocrat and former member of parliament. He also excavated on Newton's behalf at the nearby site of Didyma.

=== Kameiros ===
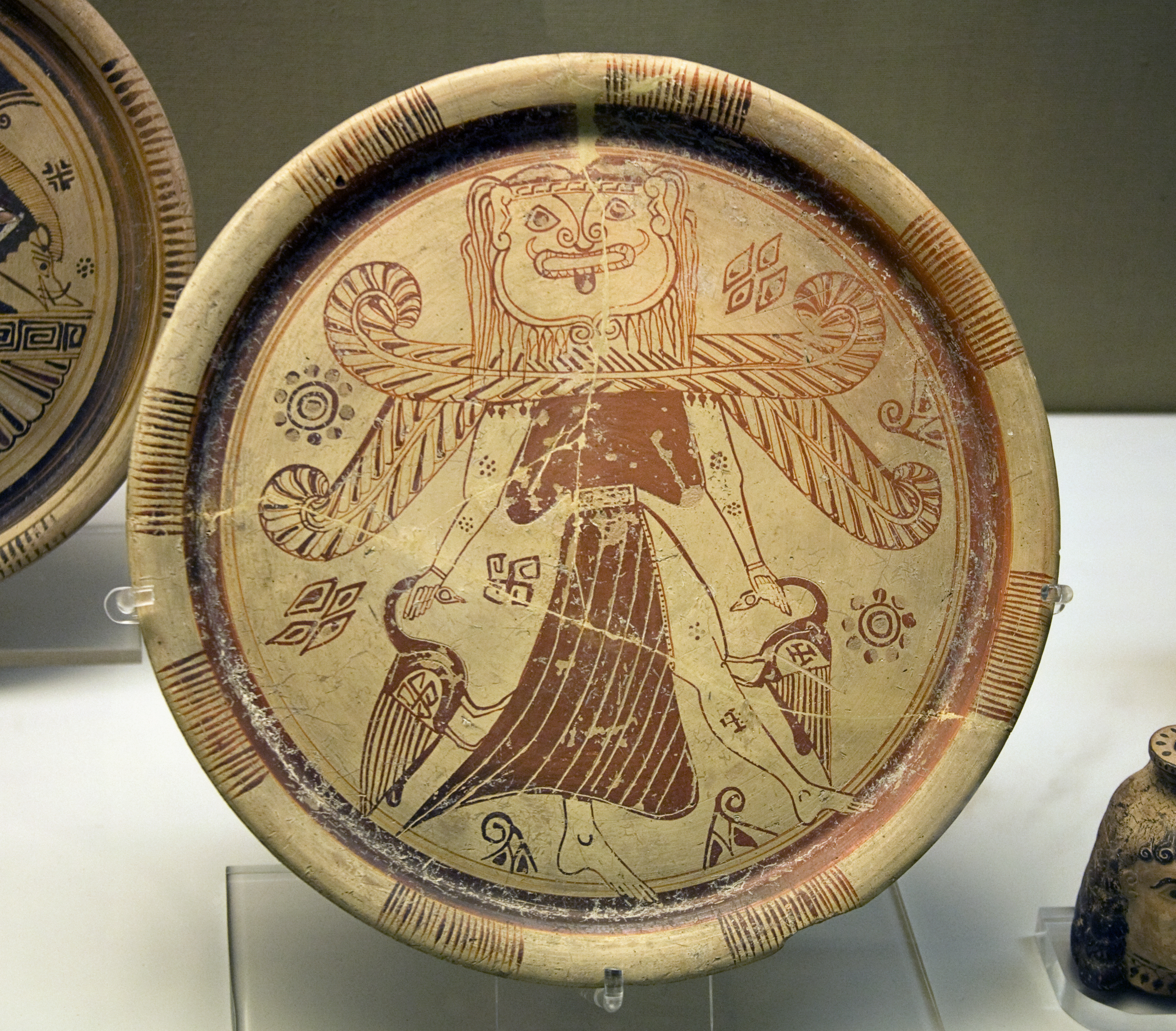
An archaic plate showing a gorgon, excavated by Biliotti and Salzmann at Kameiros on Rhodes

In common with other archaeologists of his time, Biliotti had an interest in locating the three ancient cities of Rhodes – Kameiros, Ialysos and Lindos – known from ancient literary sources. Charles Newton first suggested the possible location of Kameiros during his visit to Rhodes in 1853. Biliotti wrote of his intention to locate the three cities in a letter to the British Museum on 27 June 1859.

Biliotti and the French archaeologist Auguste Salzmann excavated at Kameiros from 1859 until 1864. Their excavations included two votive deposits from the settlement's acropolis and a total of 310 graves, of which 288 were burials of the archaic and classical periods in the Fikellura cemetery, 18 were from the cemeteries at Paptislures and Kasviri, and 3 were from the cemetery at Kechraki.

Biliotti and Salzmann were assisted in obtaining the necessary firman by Newton and the British Museum, to whom they sold many of their finds in exchange. The British Museum officially took charge of the excavations between October 1863 and June 1864, engaging Biliotti and Salzmann as its agents. Their finds were used by the museum to establish the chronological sequence of its ancient Greek terracotta and glass artefacts.

Newton spent most of November 1863 on Rhodes, assisting with Biliotti's excavations. He was accompanied by his wife, the artist Mary Newton, and their friend Gertrude Jekyll; Biliotti sent Turkish men as models for their drawings. Newton used his influence as the British Museum's Keeper of Greek and Roman Antiquities to ensure that the project was able to continue until 1864. In the museum's 1864 Parliamentary Report, he wrote that "the fruits of these excavations [at Kameiros] constitute some of the most important accessions which have been made for many years to the Department". (Note: Salmon 2019a, p. 98. The "Department" mentioned is the Department of Greek and Roman Antiquities, of which Newton was Keeper.) In total, Biliotti sent 2,400 objects from Kameiros to the Museum.

The excavation of Kameiros was only sparsely published: summary reports were published as articles in Salzmann's name in 1861, 1863 and 1871, and a book of sixty plates of lithographic images was released, also in Salzmann's name, in 1875, three years after the latter's death. In 1881, Biliotti's nephew, Edouard Biliotti, and a priest, Abbé Cottret, published some of the descriptions Biliotti had made of the graves there. (Note: Salmon 2019b, pp. 157–158. The publication is Biliotti & Cottret 1881.) Biliotti made several errors in recording information about his finds, such as the types of pottery or the specific tombs in which they were found; in other cases, labels were written unclearly by members of Biliotti's team, leading them to be incorrectly categorised by the British Museum. Biliotti returned to Kameiros and excavated there, without a collaborator, in 1885.

=== Bargylia ===
Between February and September 1865, Biliotti collaborated with Salzmann to conduct excavations in the area of the Mausoleum at Halicarnassus, near Bodrum in southwestern Turkey. (Note: Gill 2004, p. 80. Higgs gives the beginning of the excavation as March.) These followed earlier excavations by Newton in the same area; Biliotti and Salzmann worked in plots of land which Newton had initially been unable to purchase for archaeological work.

During the excavations, Biliotti became the first to document a tomb at Bargylia in the shape of the mythical Scylla. He collected fragments of its architecture and sculpture for the British Museum, and wrote an account of the monument and its condition. The location of the tomb was subsequently forgotten; when it was rediscovered in 1991, Geoffrey Waywell used Biliotti's notes to help form his reconstruction of the monument.

=== Ialysos ===
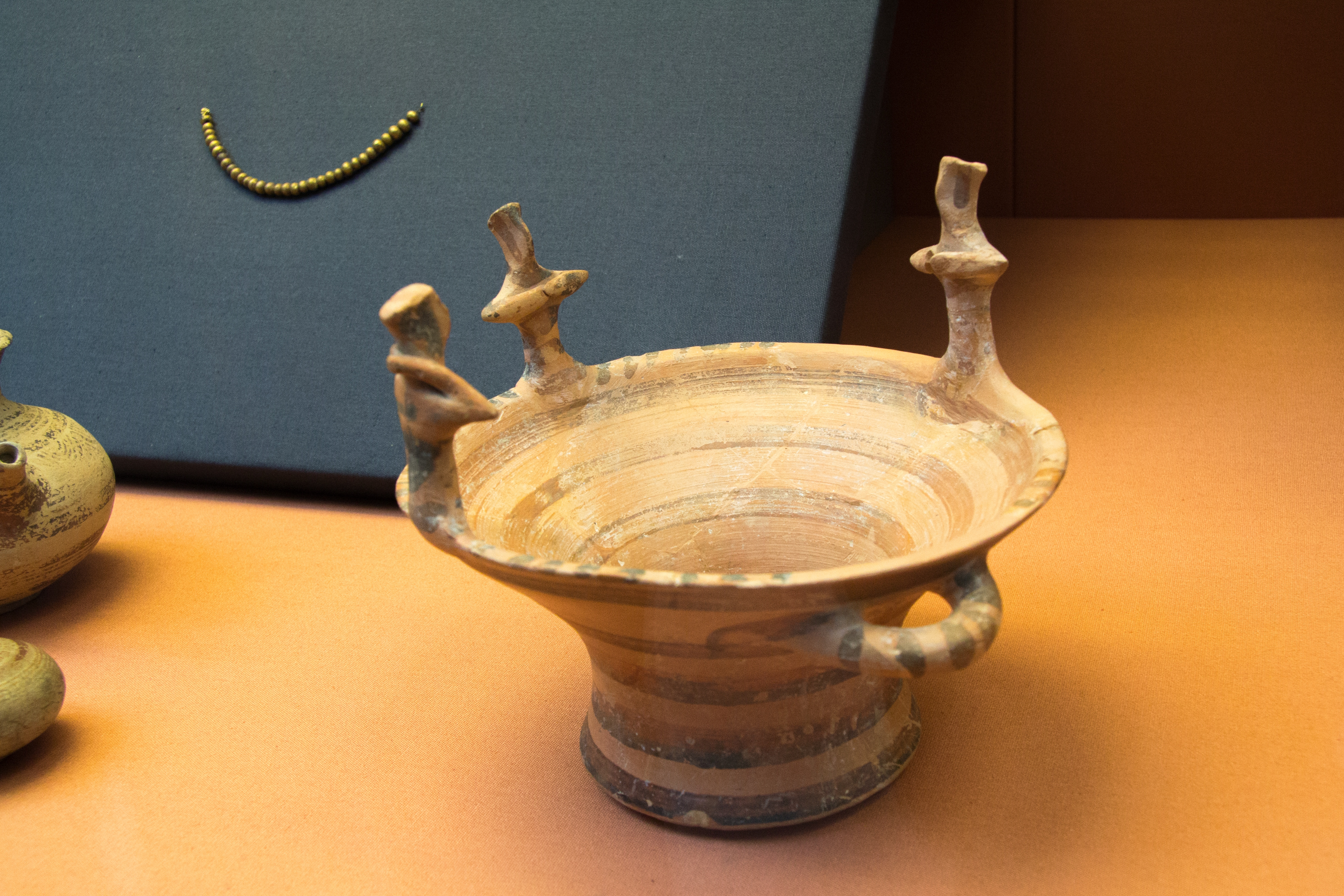
A Mycenaean kalathos from the twelfth century BCE, excavated by Biliotti at Ialysos and bought for the British Museum by John Ruskin in 1870

Biliotti excavated on Ialysos on Rhodes on behalf of the British Museum in 1868 and 1870. His excavations here uncovered the first examples of Mycenaean painted pottery known to archaeological scholarship. The objects were bought by the polymath John Ruskin, who gave them to the British Museum: they were the first large group of Mycenaean artefacts to enter its collections.

Although Biliotti's notes on the stratigraphy of their find-spots would have allowed archaeologists to realise that his finds dated to the Late Bronze Age (c. 1200–1100 BCE), and so belonged to a hitherto-unknown prehistoric civilisation, he incorrectly dated them initially to the seventh century BCE, and then to the eleventh century BCE. Although the finds included a scarab of the Egyptian pharaoh Amenhotep III, then believed to date from before 1400 BCE, Newton considered it to predate most of the finds, which he dated no earlier than the eleventh century. Most of the Mycenaean artefacts were therefore incorrectly identified as belonging to the classical period and as being "oriental" works imported to Rhodes, and received comparatively little scholarly attention until after the excavations of Heinrich Schliemann at Mycenae in 1876, during which Schliemann named the civilisation of Bronze Age Greece as "Mycenaean". It was then realised that the Ialysos finds belonged to the same culture.

=== Satala ===
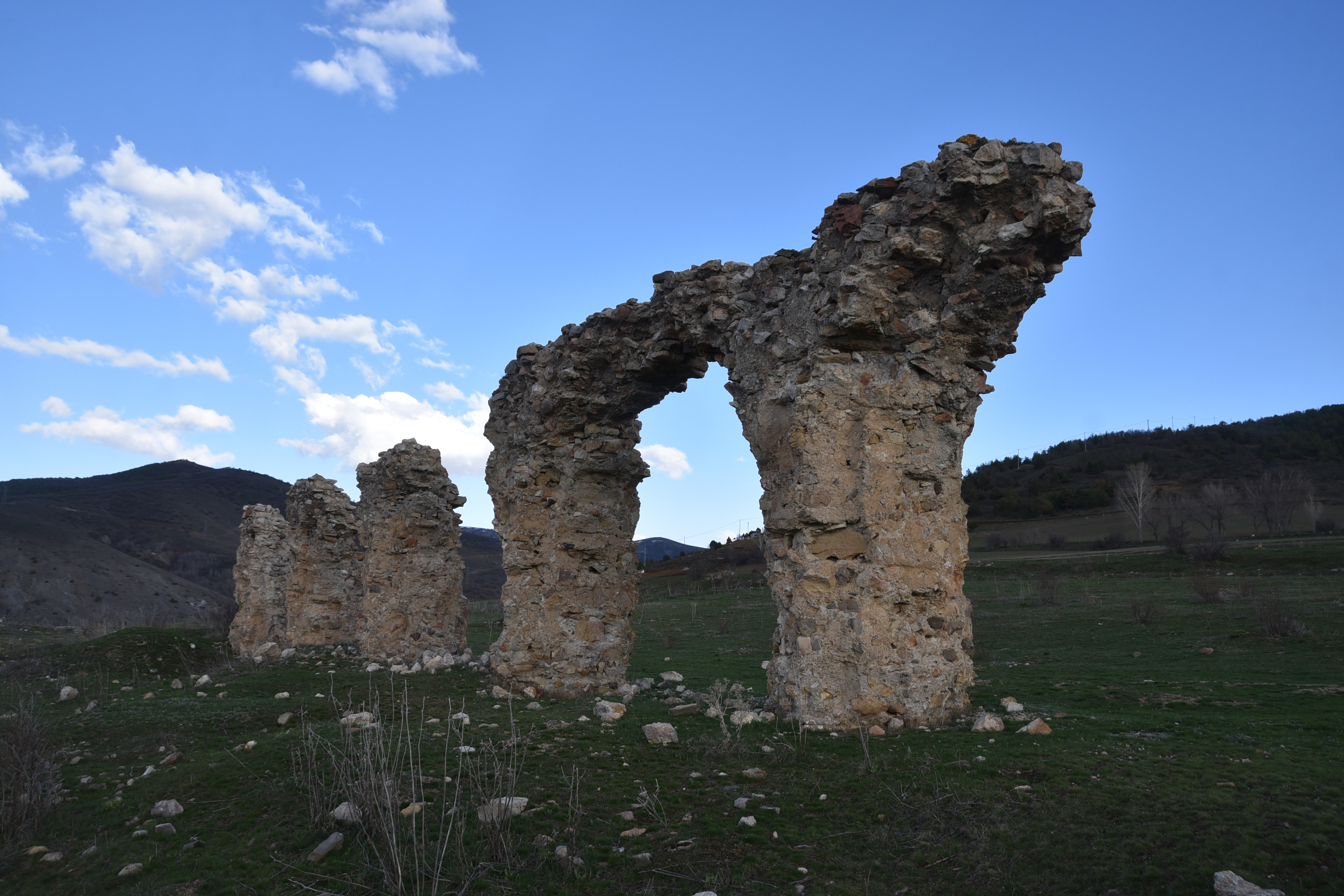
Roman remains at Satala, photographed in 2022

During his service at Trebizond, Biliotti visited the Turkish town of Saddak for nine days in September 1874. The visit was prompted by the discovery there, in 1872, of fragmentary bronze statues including a head and hand of the goddess Aphrodite. (Note: A false story later emerged that Biliotti had excavated the head and brought it to the British Museum; Biliotti did not in fact visit Satala until two years after its discovery.) (Note: Lightfoot 1998, p. 274; Gunning 2022, p. 225. Lightfoot gives the date of the sculptures' discovery as 1873, which was the year that the British Museum first learned of their excavation. The head was in the collection of the antiquities dealer Alessandro Castellani by October 1872, when he mentioned it in a letter.) Newton tasked Biliotti with investigating the provenance of the Aphrodite statue, which had also been claimed as a find from Thessaly; Biliotti wrote two letters back to Newton, on 22 December 1873 and 4 March 1874, affirming that it had indeed been found at Saddak. Newton subsequently sent him to Saddak to ascertain whether any additional fragments of the statue or other works were to be found there, and persuaded the Foreign Office to grant Biliotti the necessary time off from his duties and money to cover his expenses during the expedition.

Biliotti's explorations at Saddak were hampered by poor weather, but he reported that local peasants had found fragments of other bronze statues in the area, and correctly asserted that it was the site of the ancient town of Satala, the fortress of the Roman Legio XV Apollinaris. Funded by £10 (equivalent to £978 in 2025) of Newton's own money, Biliotti made small-scale excavations with a team of 36 workers in the fields where the Aphrodite statue was reported to have been found, which turned up no further sculptural remains. Biliotti correctly identified the basilica of the site, though contemporary archaeologists generally dismissed his interpretation and considered the building to be an aqueduct. Although Biliotti instructed the locals to alert him of any further archaeological finds, none were forthcoming, and the British Museum decided against a full excavation of the site, believing the cost to be prohibitive and the ruling Ottoman Empire likely to impose difficulties upon the export of any finds to Britain.

Biliotti made a report of his excavations to Frederick Stanley, the Financial Secretary to the War Office, on 24 September, but it was not published until 1974. (Note: Mitford 1974, p. 225. For Stanley's position, see Matthew 2004.) In that year, the archeologist Terence Mitford wrote that it "remains by far the best description of the legionary fortress" at Satala, partly because the site had deteriorated considerably in the century since Biliotti's visit. (Note: The archaeologist Christopher Lightfoot, who led his own survey at Satala, reaffirmed Mitford's judgement in 1998.) According to Mitford, Biliotti's work was the only recorded archaeological excavation in the Roman frontier region of Lesser Armenia, or on the limes (frontier fortifications) between Trebizond and the Keban Dam.

=== Çirişli Tepe ===
In 1883, Biliotti discovered the hilltop sanctuary of Çirişli Tepe, approximately 50 kilometres (31 miles) south of the ancient Greek city of Amisos on the Turkish coast of the Black Sea. He collected objects from the surface around the remains of a rock-cult altar, numbering around 680 votive terracotta figurines, 10 clay lamps and some other potsherds. He also found a bilingual inscription in both Greek and Latin, recording a dedication to Apollo made in the 1st century CE by Casperius Alianus, a resident of Amisos. "Alianus" may have been Casperius Aelianus, who served as praetorian prefect to the emperors Domitian and Nerva.

Biliotti initially kept the finds he discovered, but gave them to the British Museum in 1885. No formal study or archaeological publication of the finds was made until 2015.

== Honours and personal life ==
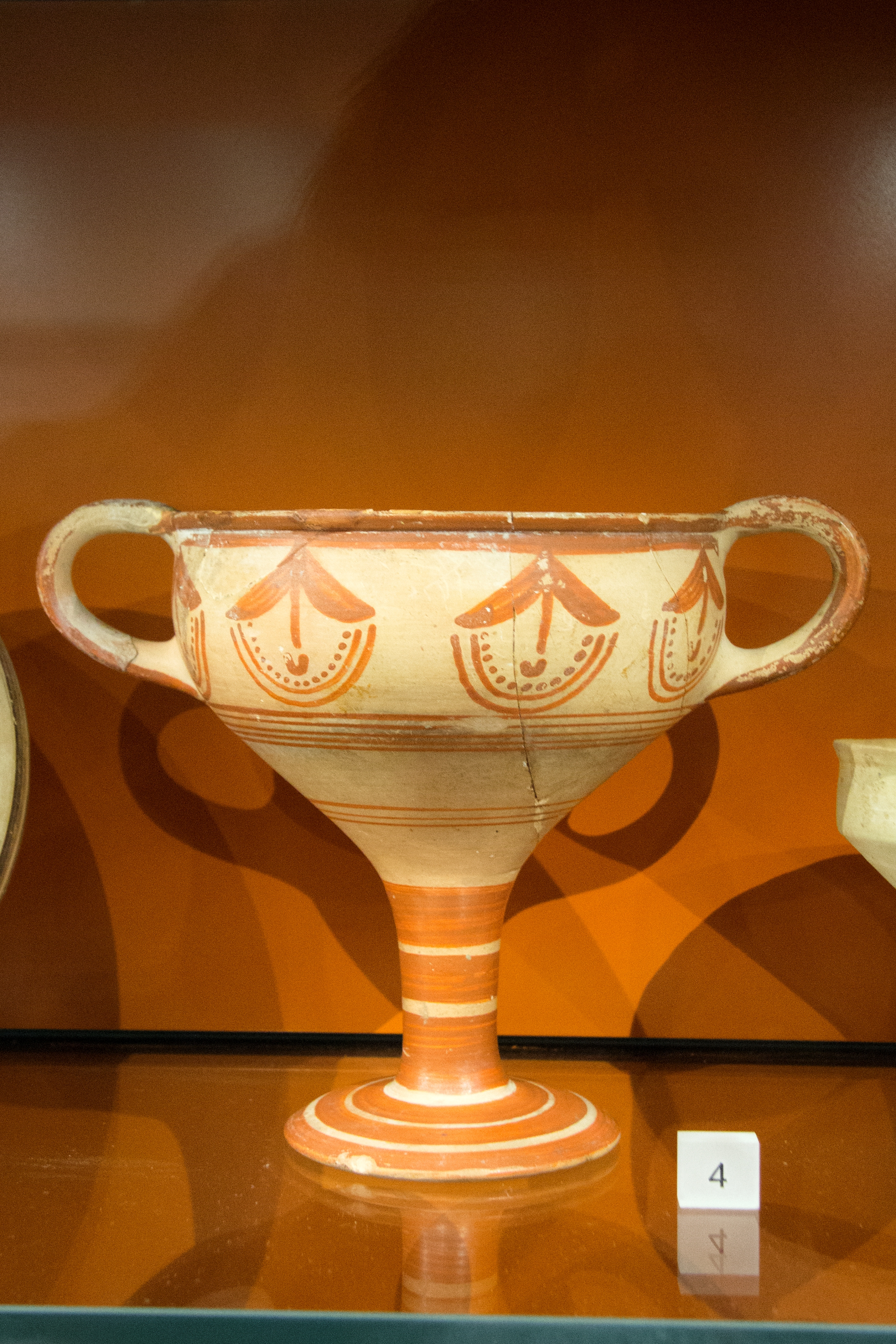
A Mycenaean kylix, made between 1375 and 1300 BCE, discovered by Biliotti at Ialysos

In 1882, Biliotti was elected as an honorary member of the Society for the Promotion of Hellenic Studies. He was made a Companion of the Order of St Michael and St George in 1886, and a Companion of the Order of the Bath in the 1890 Birthday Honours. He was knighted in 1896 as a Knight Commander of the Order of St Michael and St George, on the orders of Lord Salisbury, giving him equal rank to the British ambassador – an unusual honour for a consular official in the period.

In 1889, while stationed at Khania, Biliotti married Marguerite, a close relative of Paul Blanc, the French consul on the island. The Biliottis had one son, Emile, who moved the family to Italy and died there in the late 1930s. Biliotti was the only member of his family to take British nationality; his son and grandchildren were Italian nationals.

In later life, Biliotti grew deaf: a story developed in 1897 that other newspaper reporters would listen into conversations between Biliotti and James David Bourchier, a correspondent for The Times, as both had to shout in order to be heard by the other. After January 1903, shortly before his retirement, he developed an eye complaint which prevented him from reading and writing: in a letter of 31 July, he wrote to Graves that H. S. Shipley, Biliotti's consular assistant, had deputised for him when his poor eyesight prevented him from carrying out his duties.

== Assessment ==
Biliotti's consular reports have been widely used by historians and scholars of the Ottoman Empire. The historian Michael Meeker describes Biliotti as "more an oriental than an orientalist". The English lawyer and antiquarian R. A. H. Bickford-Smith visited Crete in 1896, and wrote that Biliotti was "as wily as a Greek, as supple as an Arab, and as inscrutable as a Turk". He described Biliotti as "an intellectual head taller than the average man", and wrote that he was "short and deaf, but nothing escapes his eye". (Note: Bickford-Smith 1898, pp. 87–88; Rodogno 2011, p. 228, n. 10 (including the date).)

Reflecting on the Cretan crisis of 1897, Harris, who had commanded the British naval forces in the theatre, called Biliotti "in every way the right man in the right place" for his knowledge of Mediterranean languages and customs. (Note: Quoted in Llewellyn-Smith 2021, p. 93. For Harris's role in the Cretan Revolt, see Plarr 1899, p. 482.) Bickford-Smith judged that Biliotti was "all times and in all ways the ‘boss'" of the other consuls, and titled his pen-portrait of him "The Dictator". Biliotti's prominence seems to have been a source of bitterness for junior consular officials in Constantinople, to whom the consulates in which Biliotti worked were nominally subordinate; they mocked his poor English by underlining the grammatical mistakes in his letters.

Biliotti's views of Christians and Muslims were a matter of dispute during his career, and have been among historians. On Crete, he was variously accused of improperly favouring the Turks and the Greeks; both charges made by, among others, his British diplomatic colleagues. The historians Robert Holland and Diana Markides have argued that neither charge was correct, and that Biliotti considered all of Crete's peoples both peace-loving, credulous and vulnerable to manipulation. Barchard has characterised Biliotti's attitude towards Cretan Muslims as negative: when Robert Reinsch, a German tourist, was murdered in Crete in 1889, Biliotti erroneously and without evidence suggested that the crime had been the work of a Muslim secret society. Meanwhile, he adopted a credulous outlook towards reports made by Cretan Christians. Malcolm MacColl, a confidant both of George I of Greece and of William Ewart Gladstone, wrote to the latter in April 1897 to endorse George's opinion that Biliotti was "more Turkish than the Turks", and called Biliotti a "miserable Levantine".

Meeker has written that Biliotti developed an increasingly hostile view of Ottoman Muslims during his posting to Trebizond. According to Meeker, Biliotti considered it essential for the stability of the region that its Orthodox Christian population, which was generally opposed to Britain's imperial rival Russia, should occupy a dominant position over its Muslim inhabitants, and exaggerated the size of the Orthodox population around Trebizond in his reports in order to reinforce his argument. Of an 1885 consular report, in which Biliotti described the distribution and cultural practices of the Muslim population in the east of his district, Meeker writes, "If Biliotti's superiors believed this ... they would believe anything".

== Published works ==
- Biliotti, Alfred (10 November 1876). "The Recent Rising in Crete". The Times. p. 10.

== Works cited ==
- Barchard, David (2006). "The Fearless and Self-Reliant Servant: The Life and Career of Sir Alfred Biliotti (1833–1915), an Italian Levantine in British Service" (PDF). Studi Miceni ed Egeo-Anatolici. 48: 5–53. ISSN 1126-6651.
- Bérard, Victor (1900) [1898]. Les affaires de Crète [The Affairs of Crete] (in French) (2nd ed.). Paris: Armand Colin et Cie. OCLC 23409521.
- Bickford-Smith, Roandeau Albert Henry (1898). Cretan Sketches. London: Richard Bentley and Son. OCLC 17633272 – via Internet Archive.
- Biliotti, Edouard; l'Abbé Cottret (1881). L'île de Rhodes [The Island of Rhodes]. Rhodes: Edouard Biliotti and l'Abbé Cottret. OCLC 9507697 – via Internet Archive.
- Brown, Ann Cynthia (2001). Arthur Evans's Travels in Crete, 1894–1899. British Archaeological Reports International Series. Vol. 1000. Oxford: Archaeopress. ISBN 1841712817.
- Brown, Keith (2013). Loyal Unto Death: Trust and Terror in Revolutionary Macedonia. Bloomington: Indiana University Press. ISBN 9780253008473.
- Calic, Marie-Janine (2019). The Great Cauldron: A History of Southeastern Europe. Cambridge, MA: Harvard University Press. ISBN 9780674983922.
- Challis, Debbie (2023). "The Ghosts of Ann Mary Severn Newton: Grief, an Imagined Life and (Auto)biography". In Lewis, Clare; Moshenska, Gabriel (eds.). Life-Writing in the History of Archaeology: Critical Perspectives. London: UCL Press. pp. 379–404. ISBN 9781800084506 – via Google Books.
- "Consule Biliotti". Punch. Vol. 112. 20 March 1897. p. 143 – via Google Books.
- Coutsinas, Nadia (2006). "À la conquête de Cnossos: archéologie et nationalismes en Crète 1878–1900" [To the Conquest of Knossos: Archaeology and Nationalisms in Crete, 1878–1900]. European Review of History: Revue européenne d'histoire (in French). 13 (4): 515–532. doi:10.1080/13507480601049187.
- De Grummond, Nancy Thomson (11 May 2015). Encyclopedia of the History of Classical Archaeology. Abingdon: Routledge. ISBN 978-1-134-26861-0.
- Ferguson, Michael (2010). "Enslaved and Emancipated Africans on Crete". In Cuno, Kenneth M.; Walz, Terence (eds.). Race and Slavery in the Middle East: Histories of Trans-Saharan Africans in Nineteenth-century Egypt, Sudan, and the Ottoman Mediterranean. Cairo and New York: American University in Cairo Press. pp. 171–196. ISBN 9789774163982.
- Fitton, J. Lesley (1996). The Discovery of the Greek Bronze Age. Cambridge, MA: Harvard University Press. ISBN 067421188X.
- Georgiadou, Maria (2003). "Expert Knowledge between Tradition and Reform: The Carathéodorys: A Neo-Phanariot Family in 19th Century Constantinople". In Anastassiadou-Dumont, Méropi (ed.). Médecins et ingénieurs ottomans à l'âge des nationalismes [Ottoman Doctors and Engineers in the Age of Nationalisms]. Paris: Maisonneuve et Larose. pp. 243–293. ISBN 2706817623.
- Gill, David (2004). "Biliotti, Alfred". In Todd, Robert B. (ed.). The Dictionary of British Classicists. Vol. 1. Bristol: Thoemmes Continuum. pp. 80–81. ISBN 1855069970.
- Gill, David (2023). "Archaeologists, Collectors, Curators and Donors: Reflecting on the Past Through Archaeological Lives". In Lewis, Clare; Moshenska, Gabriel (eds.). Life-Writing in the History of Archaeology: Critical Perspectives. London: UCL Press. pp. 353–378. ISBN 9781800084506 – via Google Books.
- Goldstein, Erik (2005). Wars and Peace Treaties: 1816–1991. London and New York: Routledge. ISBN 1134899122.
- Gunning, Lucia Patrizio (2022). "Cultural Diplomacy in the Acquisition of the Head of the Satala Aphrodite for the British Museum". Journal of the History of Collections. 34 (2): 219–231. doi:10.1093/jhc/fhab025.
- Harwig, Georg (1875). The Aerial World: A Popular Account of the Life and Phenomena of the Atmosphere. New York: D. Appleton. OCLC 2208210 – via Internet Archive.
- Hertslet, Edward (1865). The Foreign Office List, Forming a Complete British Diplomatic and Consular Handbook. London: Harrison. OCLC 162820942 – via Google Books.
- Higgs, Peter (1997). "A Newly Found Fragment of Free-Standing Sculpture from the Mausoleum at Halicarnassus". In Jenkins, Ian; Waywell, Geoffrey B. (eds.). Sculptors and Sculpture of Caria and the Dodecanese. London: British Museum Press. pp. 30–35. ISBN 0714122122.
- Holland, Robert; Markides, Diana (2006). The British and the Hellenes: Struggles for Mastery in the Eastern Mediterranean 1850–1960. Oxford: Oxford University Press. ISBN 9780191554681.
- Jenkins, Ian (2006). Greek Architecture and Its Sculpture. Cambridge, MA: Harvard University Press. ISBN 9780674023888.
- Kaloudis, George (2019). Navigating Turbulent Waters: Greek Politics in the Era of Eleftherios Venizelos. London: Lexington Books. ISBN 9781498587396.
- Karakasidou, Anastasia (2002). "The Burden of the Balkans". Anthropological Quarterly. 75 (3): 575–589. doi:10.1353/anq.2002.0044. JSTOR 3318205.
- Kotsonas, Antonis (2019). "History of Research". In Lemos, Irene S.; Kotsonas, Antonis (eds.). A Companion to the Archaeology of Early Greece and the Mediterranean. Chichester: Wiley. doi:10.1002/9781118769966. ISBN 9781118769966.
- Kutbay, Elif Yeneroğlu (2014). "Economic and Commercial Conditions of the Island of Rhodes at the Beginning of the 20th Century, According to the Reports of Sir Alfred Biliotti" (PDF). Journal of Modern Turkish History Studies. 14 (29): 39–56.
- Lightfoot, Christopher S. (1998). "Survey Work at Satala: A Roman Legionary Fortress in North-East Turkey". In Matthews, Roger (ed.). Ancient Anatolia: Fifty Years' Work by the British Institute of Archaeology at Ankara. London: British Institute at Ankara. pp. 273–284. ISBN 1898249113 – via Academia.edu.
- Llewellyn-Smith, Michael (2021). Venizelos: The Making of a Greek Statesman, 1864–1914. Oxford: Oxford University Press. ISBN 9780197610824.
- Matthew, Henry Colin Gray (2004). "Stanley, Frederick Arthur, Sixteenth Earl of Derby". Oxford Dictionary of National Biography (online ed.). Oxford University Press. (Subscription, Wikipedia Library access or UK public library membership required.)
- MacGillivray, Joseph Alexander (2000). Minotaur: Sir Arthur Evans and the Archaeology of the Minoan Myth. New York: Hill and Wang. ISBN 9780809030354.
- McGuire, Valerie (2020). Italy's Sea: Empire and Nation in the Mediterranean, 1895–1945. Liverpool: Liverpool University Press. ISBN 9781800348004.
- Meeker, Michael (2010) [2004]. "Greeks Who Are Muslims". In Shankland, David (ed.). Archaeology, Anthropology and Heritage in the Balkans and Anatolia: The Life and Times of F. W. Hasluck, 1878–1920. Vol. 2. Piscataway: Gorgias Press. pp. 299–325. doi:10.31826/9781463225438. ISBN 9781463225438.
- Miller, William (1934) [1910]. "The Ottoman Empire and the Balkan Peninsula". In Ward, Adolphus; Prothero, George W.; Leathes, Stanley (eds.). The Cambridge Modern History. Vol. 12. Cambridge: Cambridge University Press. pp. 381–428. OCLC 929406450 – via Internet Archive.
- Mitford, Terence Bruce (1974). "Biliotti's Excavations at Satala". Anatolian Studies. 24: 221–244. doi:10.2307/3642610. JSTOR 3642610.
- Morray, David (2009). "Graves, Sir Robert Wyndham". Dictionary of Irish Biography. Archived from the original on 20 July 2024.
- Mylonakis, Leonidas (2023). Piracy in the Eastern Mediterranean: Maritime Marauders in the Greek and Ottoman Aegean. London: Bloomsbury Academic. ISBN 9780755643608.
- Peçe, Uğur Z. (2024). Island and Empire: How Civil War in Crete Mobilized the Ottoman World. Stanford: Stanford University Press. ISBN 9781503639249.
- Plarr, Victor (1899). Men and Women of the Time: A Dictionary of Contemporaries (15th ed.). London: G. Routledge. OCLC 5094803 – via Internet Archive.
- Pritchard, R. John (2015). "International Humanitarian Intervention and Establishment of an International Jurisdiction over Crimes Against Humanity: The National and International Military Trials on Crete in 1898". In Carey, John; Pritchard, R. John; Dunlap, William (eds.). International Humanitarian Law: Origins. Leiden: Brill. pp. 1–88. ISBN 9789047442820.
- Rathberger, Andreas (2010). "Austria–Hungary, the Cretan Crisis, and the Ambassadors' Conference of Constantinople in 1896". In Suppan, Arnold; Graf, Maximilian (eds.). From the Austrian Empire to Communist East Central Europe. Münster: Lit Verlag. pp. 83–112. ISBN 9783643502353.
- Rix, Alison (2018). "George Maw (1832–1912): His Crocus Monograph, Travels, and Correspondents from the Ottoman Empire". In Aščerić-Todd, Ines; Starkey, Janet; Starkey, Paul; Knees, Sabina (eds.). Travellers in Ottoman Lands: The Botanical Legacy. Oxford: Archaeopress. pp. 205–226. ISBN 9781784919160.
- Rodogno, Davide (2011). Against Massacre: Humanitarian Interventions in the Ottoman Empire, 1815–1914. Princeton: Princeton University Press. doi:10.23943/princeton/9780691151335.001.0001. ISBN 9780691151335.
- Salmon, Nicholas (2019a). "Archives and Attribution: Reconstructing the British Museum's Excavations of Kamiros". In Schierup, Stine (ed.). Documenting Ancient Rhodes: Archaeological Expeditions and Rhodian Antiquities. Gōsta Enbom Monographs. Vol. 6. Aarhus: Aarhus University Press. pp. 98–112. ISBN 9788771249873 – via Academia.edu.
- Salmon, Nicholas (2019b). "Excavation and Documentation of the Rhodian Countryside and Dodecanese Islands in the First Millennium BC". Archaeological Reports. 65: 157–175. doi:10.1017/S0570608419000097. JSTOR 26867454.
- Setton, Kenneth Meyer (1984). The Papacy and the Levant, 1204–1571. Vol. 3: The Sixteenth Century. Philadelphia: American Philosophical Society. OCLC 1241678661.
- Summerer, Lâtife (2015). "Bulls and Men on the Mountaintop: Votive Terracottas from Çirişli Tepe (Central Black Sea)". In Muller, Arthur; Lalı, Ergün (eds.). Figurines de terre cuite en Méditerranée grecque et romaine [Terracotta Figurines in the Greek and Roman Mediterranean]. Vol. 2. Villeneuve d’Ascq: Presses Universitaires du Septentrion. pp. 571–588. ISBN 9782757411339 – via Academia.edu.
- Villing, Alexandra (2019). "The Archaeology of Rhodes and the British Museum: Facing the Challenges of 19th-Century Excavations". In Schierup, Stine (ed.). Documenting Ancient Rhodes: Archaeological Expeditions and Rhodian Antiquities. Gōsta Enbom Monographs. Vol. 6. Aarhus: Aarhus University Press. pp. 71–98. ISBN 9788771249873 – via Academia.edu.
- Walters, Henry Beauchamp (1899). Catalogue of the Bronzes, Greek, Roman, and Etruscan, in the Department of Greek and Roman Antiquities, British Museum. London: Trustees of the British Museum. OCLC 759769991 – via Internet Archive.
