= Euphorbos plate =

Ancient Greek plate (c. 600 BC)

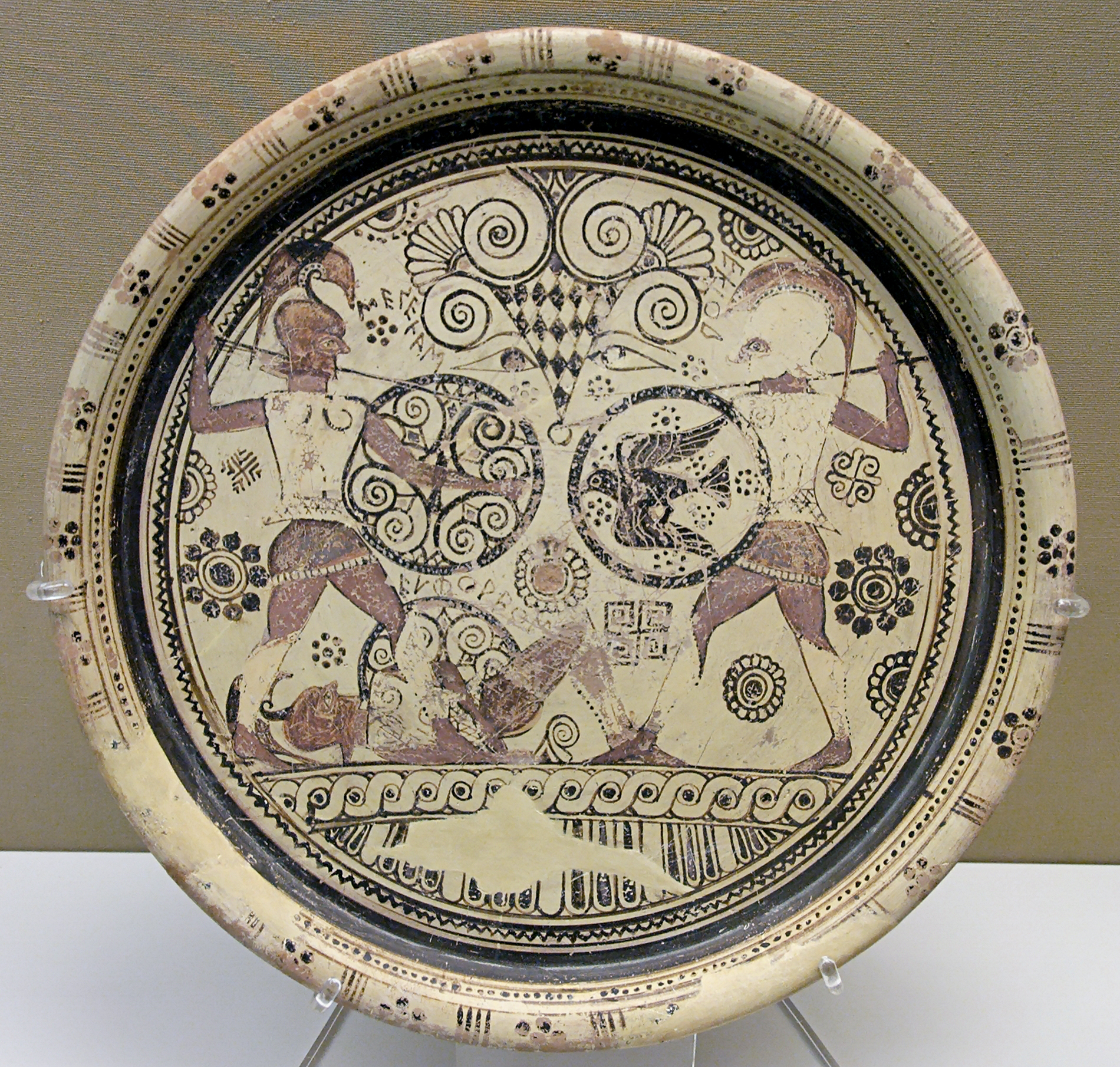
- Height: 39 cm
- Created: c. 600 BC; Rhodes
- Discovered: 1859–1860; Kameiros, Rhodes
- Discovered by: Alfred Biliotti and Auguste Salzmann
- Present location: British Museum, London, England
- Identification: 1860,0404.1

The Euphorbos plate is the name of an East Greek plate with mythological painting in the Orientalising style.

The Euphorbos plate depicts a duel between two warriors of the Trojan War, the Greek Menelaos and the Trojan Hector. Menelaos is standing over the body of the Trojan warrior Euphorbos. The scene depicts one of the most important moments of the war. After Achilles had withdrawn from battle, his best friend and lover, Patroklos, wearing Achilles' armour, took his place. Before being killed by Hector, Patroklos was wounded by Euphorbos. Euphorbos was then killed by Menelaos during the fight for the body of Patroklos. In the scene depicted, from Iliad book 17, Hector joins the fight for the body of Patroclus just after Menelaus has killed Euphorbos and prevents Menaelaos from stripping the armour from the dead body.

The plate has a diameter of 38 centimetres. It is a "Rhodian plate" (named for the place where most examples were made, including the Euphorbos plate itself). The Euphorbos plate is one of the few examples of the type which shows a mythological scene. The plate belongs to the middle Wild Goat Style. The plate is dated to c. 600 BC. It was found at Kameiros by Alfred Biliotti and Auguste Salzmann, and is now in the British Museum.

== Bibliography ==
- Thomas Mannack: Griechische Vasenmalerei. Eine Einführung. Theiss, Stuttgart 2002, ISBN 3-8062-1743-2, p. 94.
