= Lasithi massacres =

Series of massacres in 1897

- Part of the Cretan Revolt of 1897
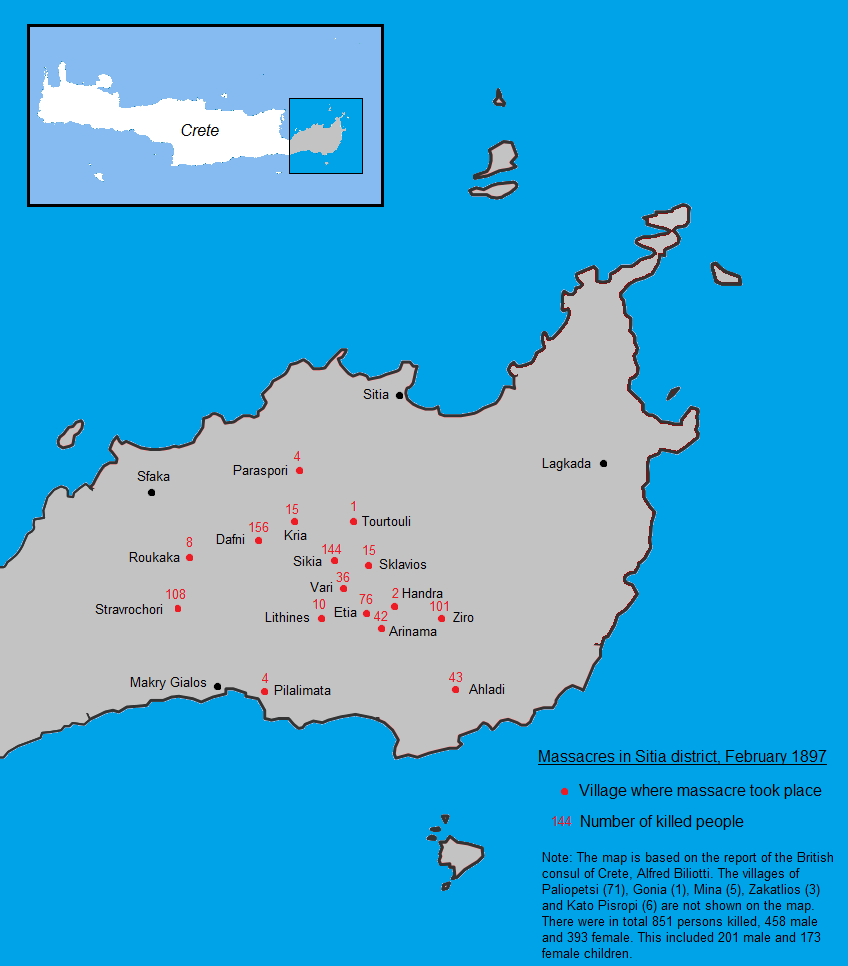
- Area where massacres took place.
- Location: Crete, Ottoman Empire
- Date: 1897
- Target: Cretan Muslims
- Attack type: Massacre
- Deaths: 850–1,000
- Perpetrator: Local Christians

The Lasithi massacres were a series of massacres committed against ethnic Turkish and Cretan Muslim civilians in 1897. They occurred in the Lasithi region of eastern Crete. Between 850 and around 1,000 people were murdered, including women and children.

== Background ==
The Ottoman Empire had conquered Crete in the 17th century and as a consequence a large part of the local Christian population remained Christian. The central government of Ottomans also sent Turkish settlers to the island. Following the Greek Revolution in 1821 there was continuing violence between the two religious communities. The Christians demanded the island's unification with Greece which the local Muslims opposed. Tensions remained high and in 1896 a violent conflict broke out which led to the landing of a Greek army on the island. Rumours of a massacre reached the Western consuls who ordered an investigation. However the first investigation was covered up, most of the investigators were local Christian Greeks. After some time a second investigation by British consul Alfred Biliotti confirmed the events.

== Massacre ==
The massacres took place during February 1897, when local Turkish and Muslim civilians were murdered by the local Greek people. At some places, Turkish civilians tried to defend themselves. A number of Muslims managed to escape. The surviving Muslims fled the areas, some 4,000 became refugees and very few returned to their homes again. Most of their lands and property had been taken over or destroyed by Greek Cretan Christians. According to the British consul Sir Alfred Biliotti, 851 people were killed - including 201 male and 173 female children, many of them raped before being killed. Archaeologist Arthur Evans, however, wrote that there were no rapes at all, citing French officials who cross-examined the survivors.

Evans, who had been in Crete for some years, returned in 1898 as a reporter for the Manchester Guardian and he wrote of the massacre:

But the most deliberate act of extermination was that perpetrated at Eteà. In this small village, too, the Moslem inhabitants, including the women and children, had taken refuge in the mosque, which the men defended for a while. The building itself is a solid structure, but the door of the small walled enclosure... was finally blown in, and the defenders laid down their arms, understanding, it would appear, that their lives were to be spared. Men, women, and children, they were all led forth to the church of St. Sophia, which lies on a hill about half an hour above the village, and then and there dispatched—the men cut to pieces, the women and children shot. A young girl who had fainted, and was left for dead, alone lived to tell the tale.

However, Evans did not call for legal sactions against the perpetrators. He believed that this massacre was necessary, as it had prevented the Muslims from killing Christians. Evans notes:

The total number of ‘Turks’ killed in the various villages—though it must be remembered that many were killed in fair fight—is estimated by the in-surgents at from twelve to thirteen hundred. This, however, is probably an exaggeration—against them-selves!—since the Turkish official report makes the number 850. These ferocious deeds, which were in fact a direct consequence of the hundredfold greater slaughter of Armenia, show that Ottoman rule is capable of engendering among its subject Christian populations a barbarism almost equal to its own. No! Not that, indeed! Nothing here was done that can equal in horror what only a few days before had been perpetrated by the Turks in Canea, when men were thrown alive into the public ovens and slowly roasted to death! The French officials who cross-examined the survivors assure me that there was no violation of women. The massacre was not preached in the churches; on the contrary, it came as a great shock to the Greek clergy of the province, and they have not ceased to denounce it. The slaughter, as it were, came of itself. It was not premeditated and organized in high quarters as that which it anticipated. It was the work of a day's frenzy, not, as in Armenia, the prolonged agony of months and years. And there can be no question that, their short madness over, there is only one feeling among the inhabitants of the province—shame and regret. Nor must it be forgotten that there was not one of those who took part in these savage acts of extermination who had not a long tale of wrongs suffered by his own kith and kin that called for vengeance; there was not a village represented among them that could not point to some traditional scene of horror perpetrated by the Turk. At Daphne the whole Christian population had been butchered within the memory of man. The men of Eteà and Sykià looked forth on the tower of Lithines (it has just been razed by the Christian villagers), where a wholesale slaughter of Christian prisoners formerly took place. At Zyro the inhabitants have not forgotten how their church was made use of for a holocaust of human victims.

== Aftermath ==
The conflict in the island continued. Local Muslims and Ottoman soldiers attacked the British troops stationed in Candia and massacred the local Christian population. After this event Ottoman troops were forced to leave the island and it was made an autonomous state under the supervision of the Great Powers. Alarmed by the events in Lasithi, Biliotti organized the evacuation of the local Muslims and Ottoman troops in Kandanos. They had been besieged by Greek rebels and they could suffer the same fate. Biliotti led an expedition and after the Turkish and Muslim civilians were robbed of their possessions by local Greek troops, they were allowed to be evacuated under escort of allied troops. Some time later Biliotti unsuccessfully tried to make an arrangement to restore the Muslims of Lasithi their lost property and land. After some time some with the influence of Greek authorities, British newspapers claimed that the massacres were false, Biliotti and Admiral Harris knew that they took place and replied to the newspapers. The Cretan Turks and Muslims were forced to emigrate from the island in later years and in 1908 the island became unified with Greece.

== List of victims according to Biliotti ==
Village	Male	Female	Total
Daphne	82	74	156
Sikia	63	81	144
Stravodoxari	55	53	108
Ethia	43	33	76
Paliopetsi	34	37	71
Ziro	59	42	101
Ahladis	34	9	43
Arinama	21	21	42
Vari	17	19	36
Zakatlios	3		3
Kria	10	5	15
Paraspori	4		4
Roukaka	7	1	8
Lithines	5	5	10
Handra	1	1	2
Gonia	1		1
Mina	2	3	5
Sklavios	11	4	15
Kata Pisropi	3	3	6
Pilalimata	2	2	4
Tourtolous	1		1
Total	458	393	851
