= Ancient Kymissala =

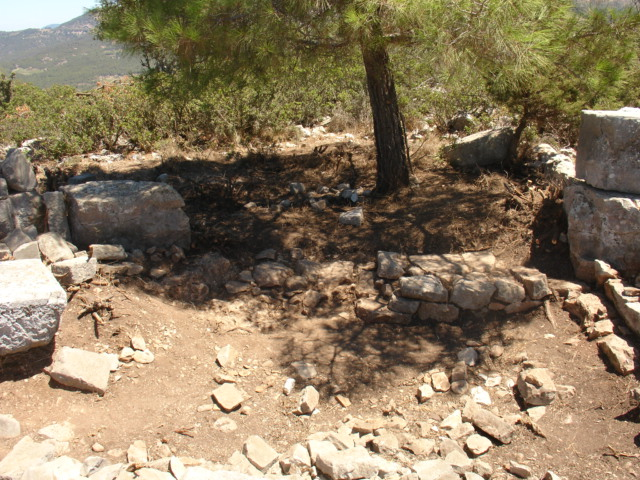
- View of ancient temple, at Acropolis

- Location within Greece
- 36°10′14″N 27°45′43″E
- Type: Human settlement, acropolis, necropolis
- Location: Rhodes
- Region: Greece

History
- Built: Mycenean period
- Abandoned: Late Antiquity

Site notes
- Website: Kymissala

The archaeological site of ancient Kymissala is located about 70 km southwest of Rhodes city, and today falls within the limits of the Municipality of Atavyros, occupying coastal areas of Monolithos and Sianna municipal departments. This is one of the most important archaeological sites in the countryside of Rhodes, as indicated by the extended visible ruins scattered in various places, dating from the Mycenaean period to Late Antiquity. During the Hellenistic period, the region, as shown by the maintenance of the ancient place name and inscriptions from the necropolis, belonged to the Demos of Kymissaleis and was subordinated to Kameiros.

== Research history ==
Kymissala is known as archaeological site since the late 19th century. The first recorded archaeological survey and excavation in the necropolis in the area was conducted by E. Billioti and L΄ Abbe Cottret in 1881. Italian archaeologists carried out the first excavations in 1915. The results and the findings were published in Annuario della Regia Scuola Archeologica di Atene in 1916. This preliminary study, which was followed by a second one has been an important guide for any new research, illustrating antiquities, for example outstanding hitherto surviving walls of the citadel, the ancient temple and many other major and lesser settlements, like Vassilika.

As it concerns Late Neolithic and Bronze Age remains in this archaeological site, sherds were found on the hill Agios Phokas and Mycenean tombs in Glyfada and Emponas were recorded in another archaeological survey, published by C. Mee.

Since 2006 the Department of Mediterranean Studies of the University of the Aegean and the Greek Ministry of Culture's 22nd Ephorate of Prehistoric and Classical Antiquities carried out systematic archaeological research and excavations, under the direction of Manolis I. Stefanakis, Associate Professor of Classical Archaeology and Numismatics, and the archaeologist Dr. Vassiliki Patsiada respectively.

== Scientific Committee ==
- Ioannis Papachristodoulou, Archaeologist Ph.D., Honorary Ephor of Antiquities, Rhodes
- Melina Philemonos, Archaeologist Ph.D., Ephor, 22nd Ephoreate of Prehistoric and Classical Antiquities, Rhodes
- Nikolaos Stampolidis, Professor of Classical Archaeology, University of Crete, Director of the Goulandris Museum of Cycladic Art, Athens
- Anagnostis Agelarakis, Professor of Paleoanthropology, Adelphi University, United States
- Kostas Zambas, Dr. Mechanical Engineer, Rhodes.

== Preliminary reports ==
Research has shown that the ancient Demos of Kymissala was extensive: the area covered is more than 10,000 acres or 10 square km. This is hardly surprising, considering that the Demos had his own acropolis on the hill Agios Fokas, which dominates the area and seems to control seven lesser human settlements, which probably belonged to the jurisdiction of Demos, namely Vassilika, Napes, Charakas, Glyfada-Monosyria, Stelies, Maramarounia and Kampanes.

Next to the settlements there is an extended necropolis with important central burial monument, which occupies the whole valley between the hills of Agios Fokas and Kymissala. Cemeteries of classical era exist elsewhere in the geographical region: in Napes, Charakas and Monosyria-St. George. Graves have been also found in Alonia and Kampanes.

The Demos of Kymissala was inhabited from the 7th century BCE until Late Antiquity (4th-6th centuries CE), as evidenced by excavations in the central necropolis and occasional archaeological findings. In the same area earliest remains from the Neolithic and the Bronze Age have been recorded, but specific archaeological sites have not been identified yet.
