= Paraspori =

Paraspori Παρασπóρι
- Neighbourhood
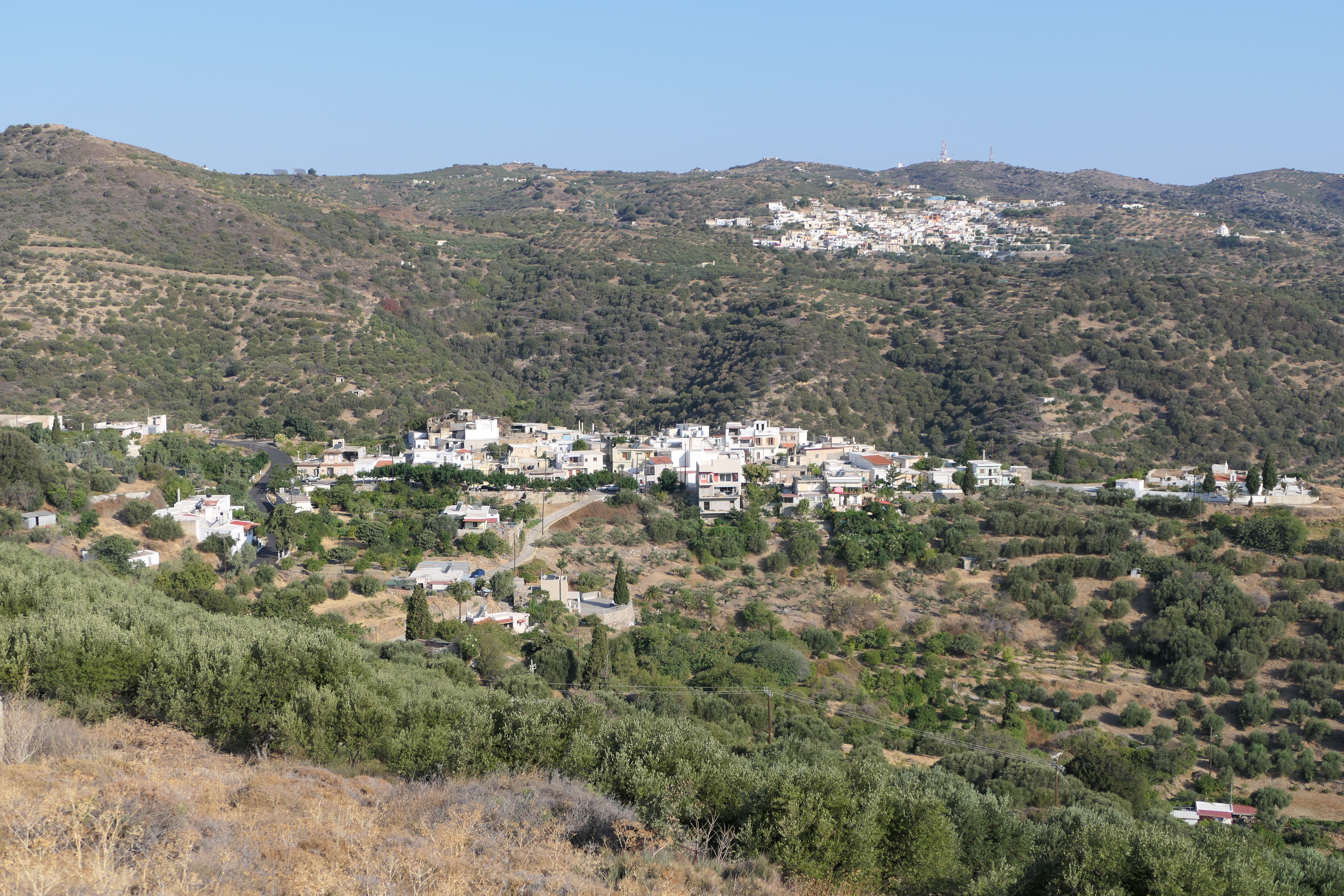

- Location in Crete, Greece
- Coordinates: 35.16609°N 26.02746°E
- Country: Greece
- Elevation: 350 m (1,150 ft)

Population
  - Total: 83

Languages
  - Official: Greek
- Time zone: UTC+2 (EET)
- PIN: 72300

Paraspori is a small settlement in Sitia, Lasithi, Crete, Greece.
