= Camirus =

Ancient Rhodian city

Coordinates: 36°20′9″N 27°55′17″E

Camirus or Kamiros (Ancient Greek: Κάμιρος; /kəˈmaɪərəs/) or Cameirus or Kameiros (Κάμειρος) was a city of ancient Rhodes, in the Dodecanese, Greece. Its site is on the northwest coast of the island, 3 kilometres (1.9 mi) west of the modern village of Kalavarda.

== History ==
=== Late Bronze ===
During the prehistoric period the area was inhabited by Mycenaean Greeks.

=== Iron Age ===
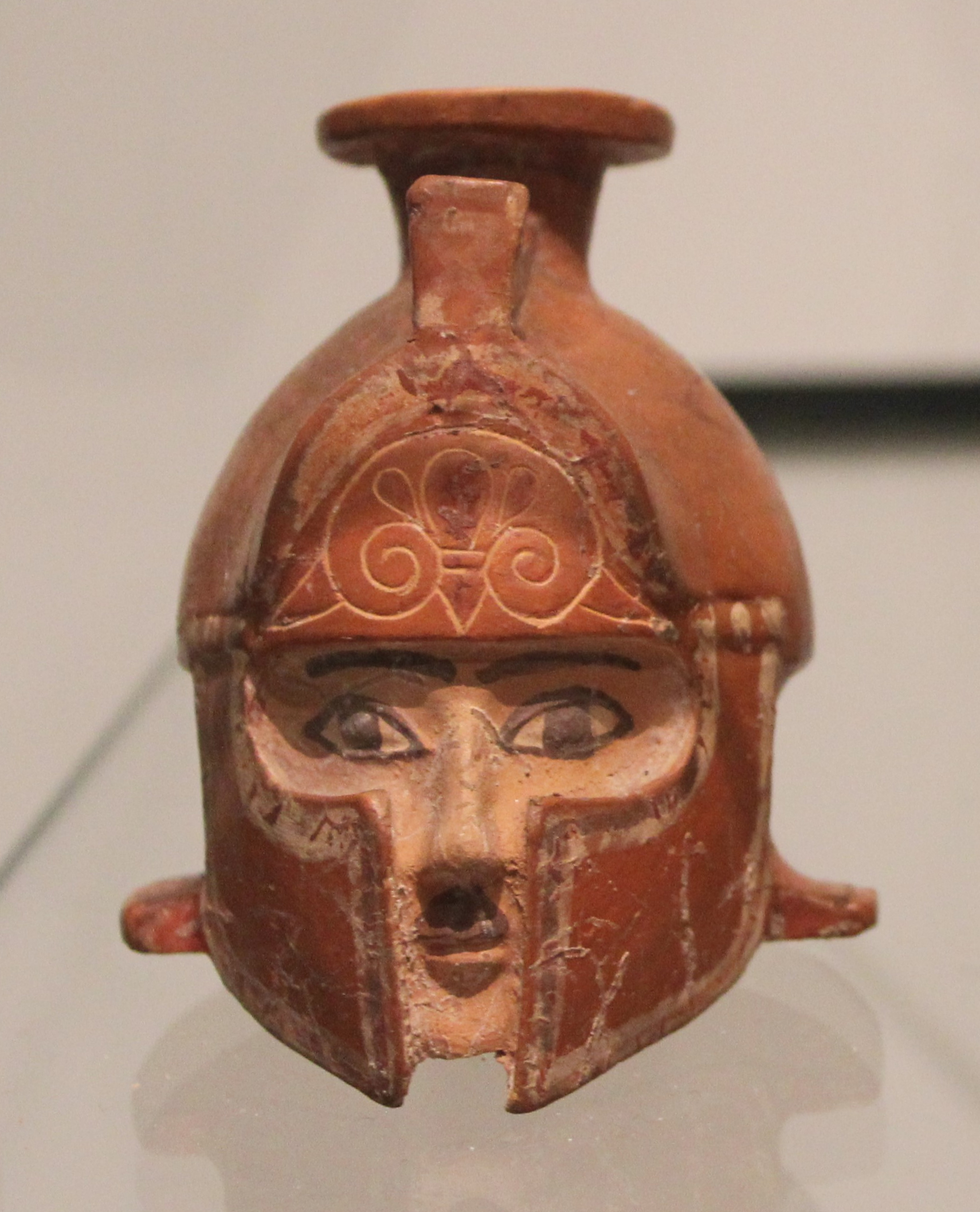
Warrior-headed vase, Camirus, Rhodes, 590-575 BC

The city itself was founded by the Dorians. The ancient city was built on three levels. At the top of the hill was the acropolis, with the temple complex of Athena Kameiras and the stoa. The temple foundations were begun at least as early as the eighth century BC. A covered reservoir having a capacity of 600 cubic meters of water—enough for up to 400 families—was constructed about the sixth century BC. Later, the stoa was built over the reservoir. The stoa consisted of two rows of Doric columns with rooms for shops or lodgings in the rear.

The main settlement was on the middle terrace, consisting of a grid of parallel streets and residential blocks. On the lower terrace are found a Doric temple, probably to Apollo; the Fountain House, with the Agora in front of it; and Peribolos of the Altars, which contained dedications to various deities.

=== Classical Age ===
The earthquake of 226 BC destroyed the city and the temple. The earthquake of 142 AD destroyed the city for the second time.

== Excavations ==
The Acropolis was excavated by Alfred Biliotti and Auguste Salzmann between 1859 and 1864. Many of the finds from their digs are now kept in the British Museum in London. In 1928 the Italian Archaeological School began a systematic excavation of the area together with restoration work which continued until the end of the Second World War.

== Gallery ==
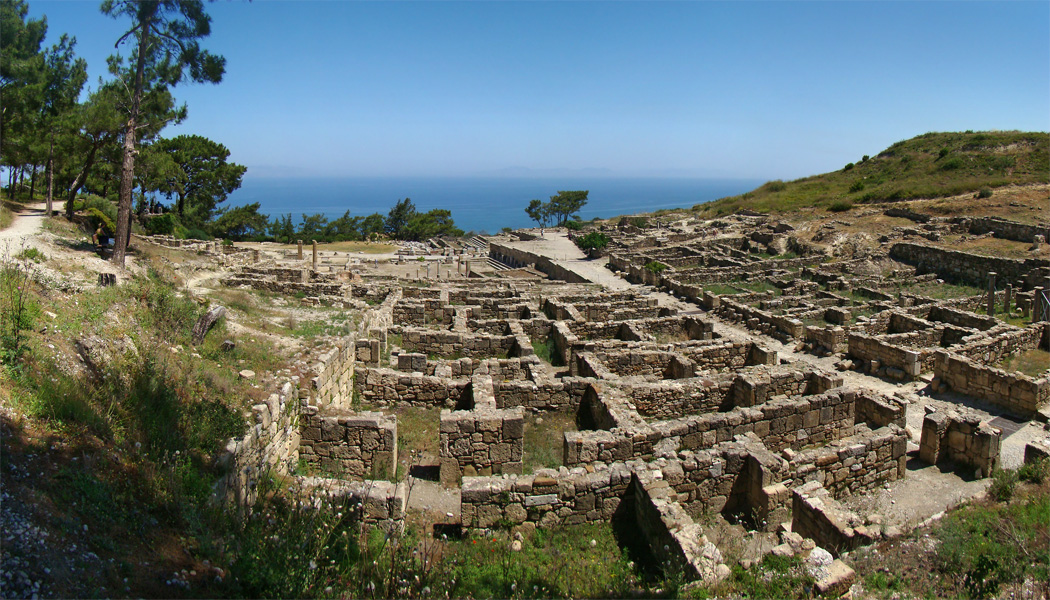
Panoramic view

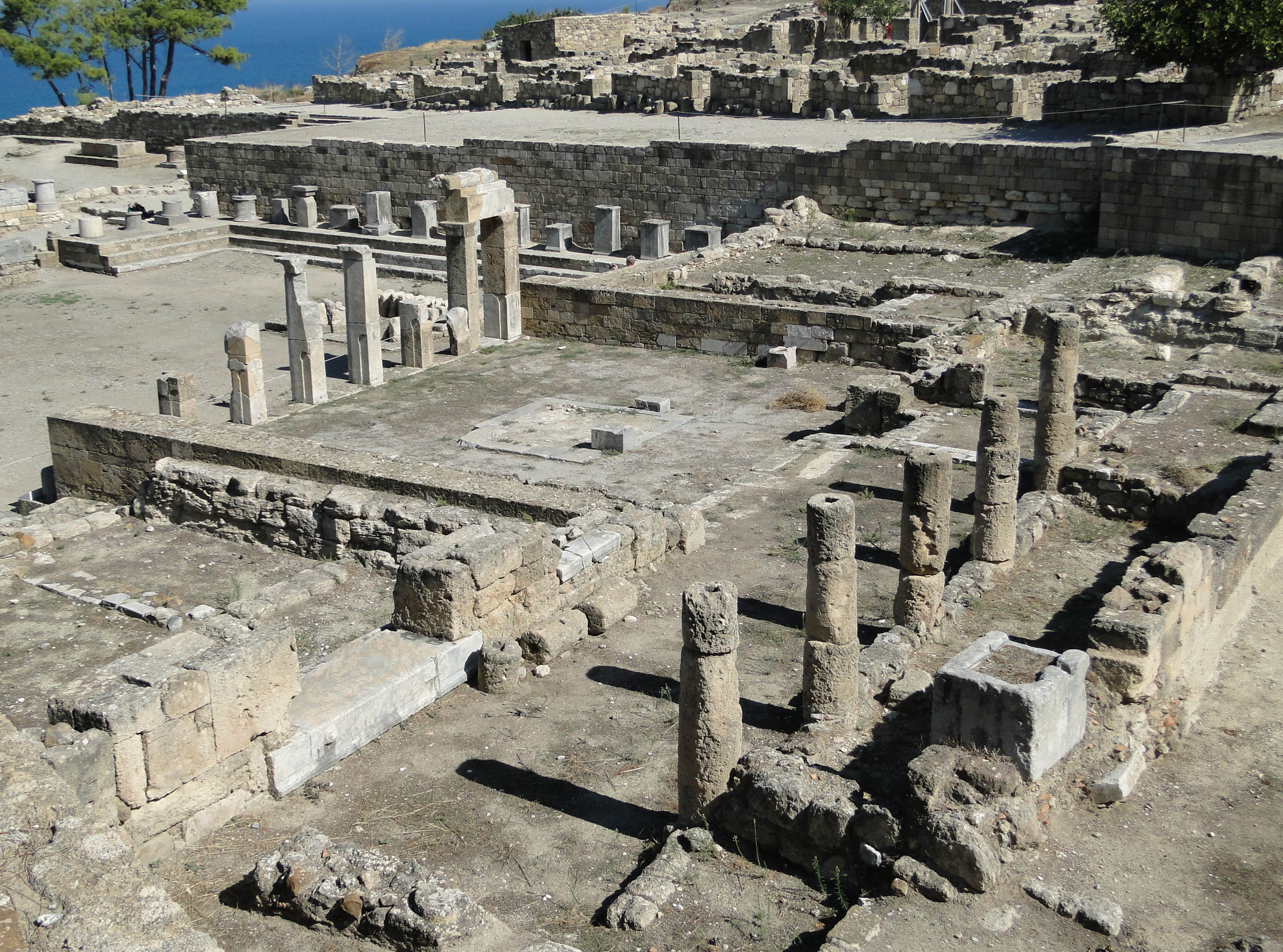
Fountain Square

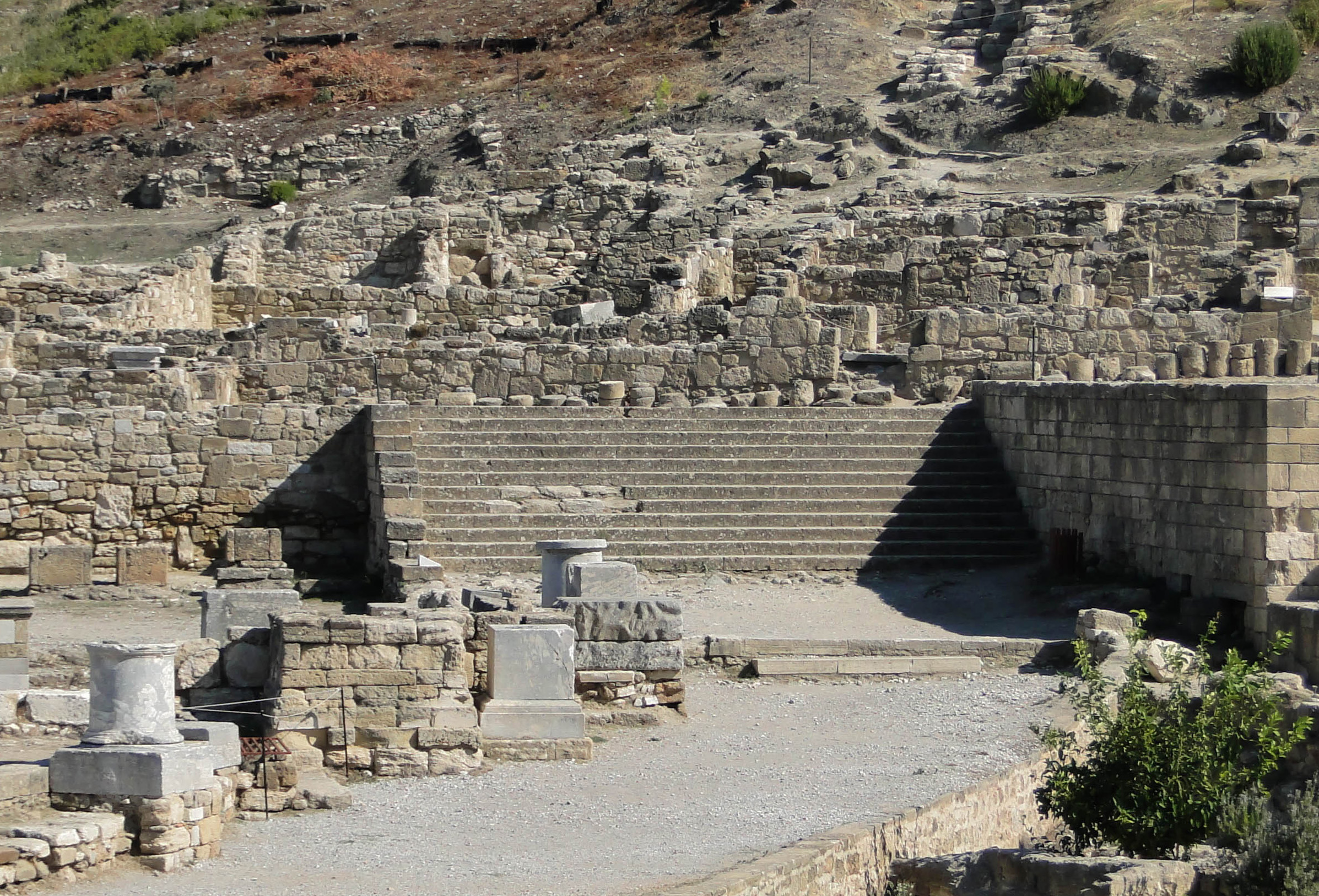
Staircase

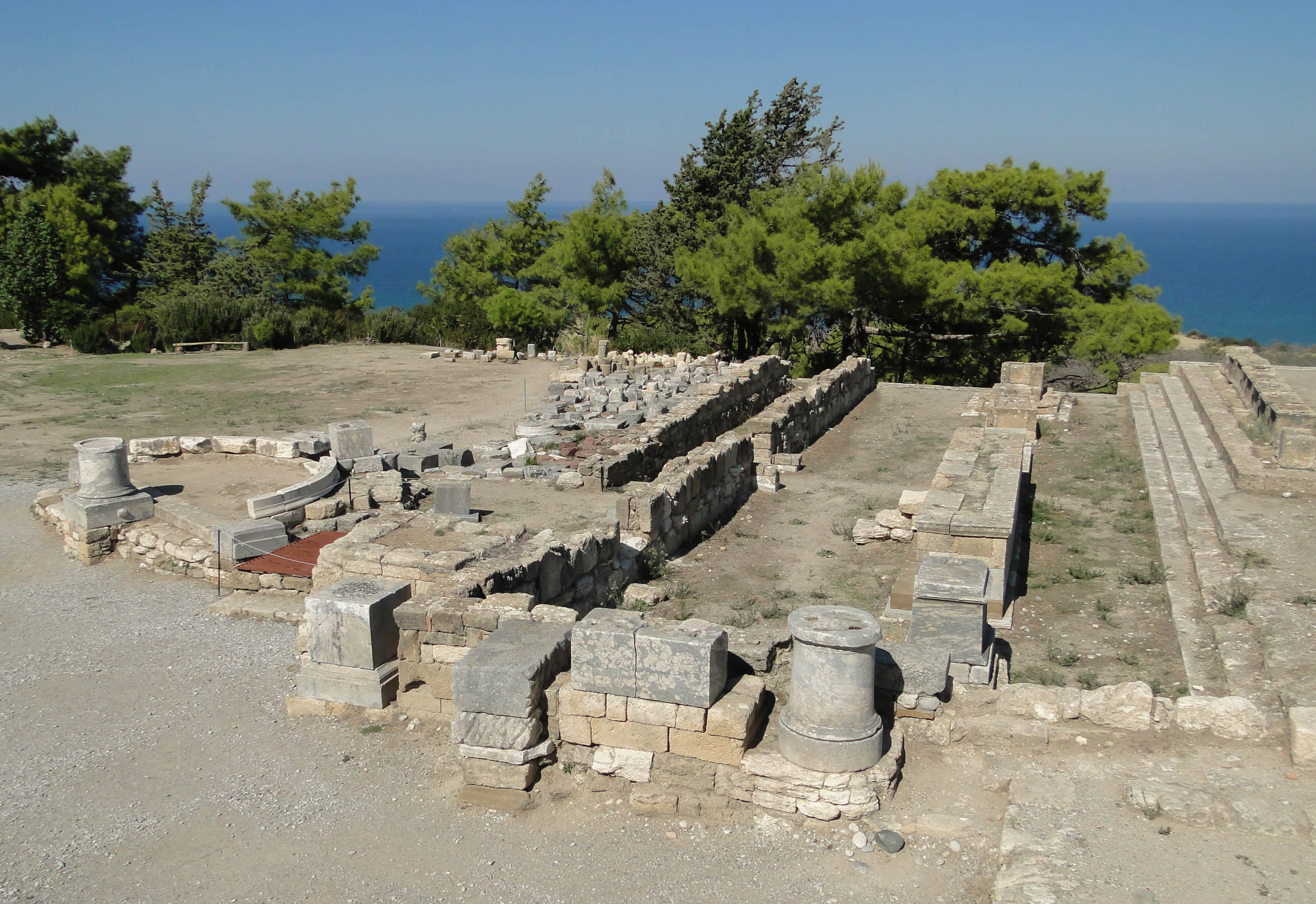
The Hierothyteion

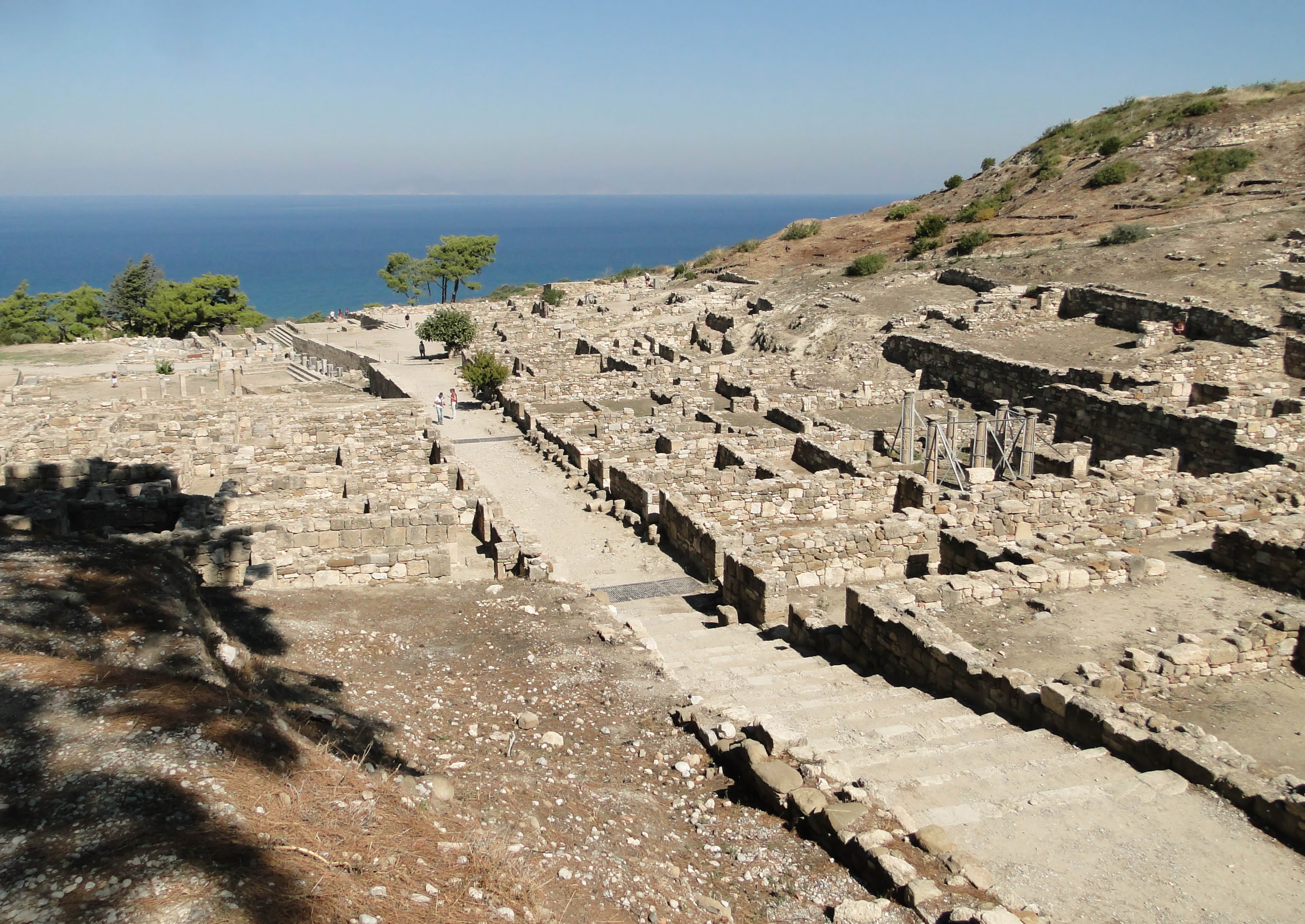
Main street

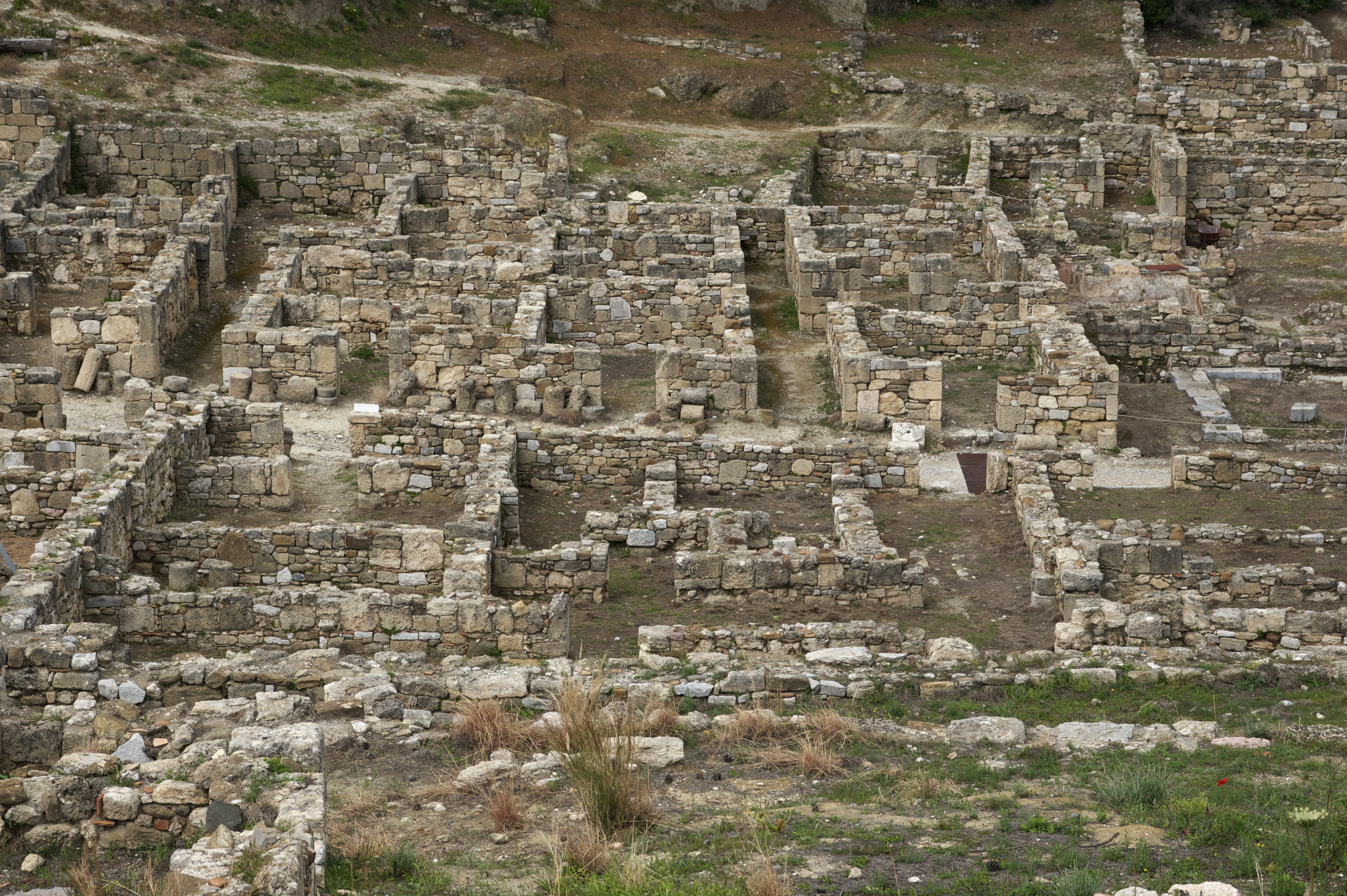
Houses of the Hellenistic period

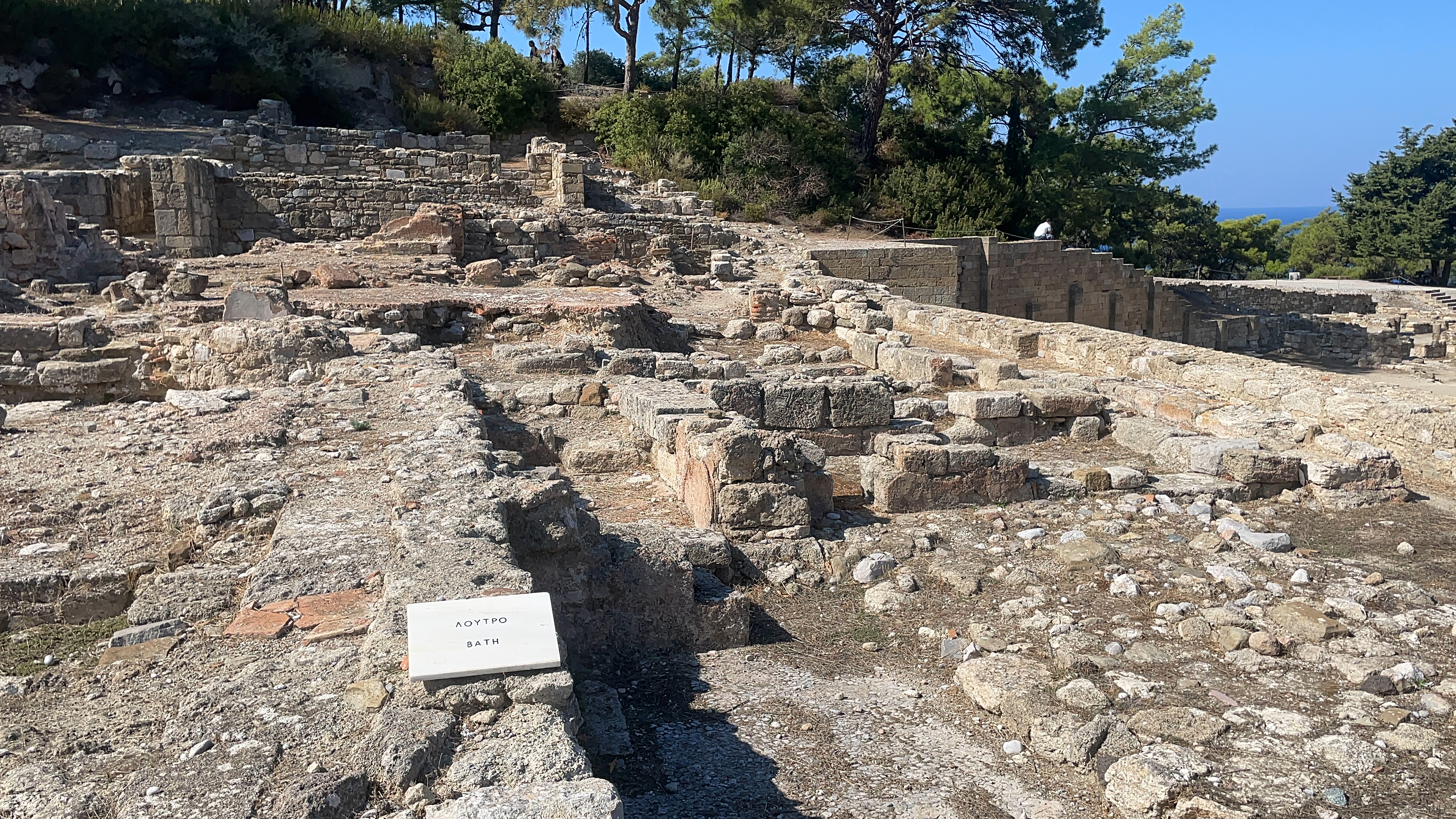
Baths of the city

== Notable people ==
- Peisander (7th century BC), epic poet
