= E. J. Dillon =

Irish author, journalist and linguist

Emile Joseph Dillon
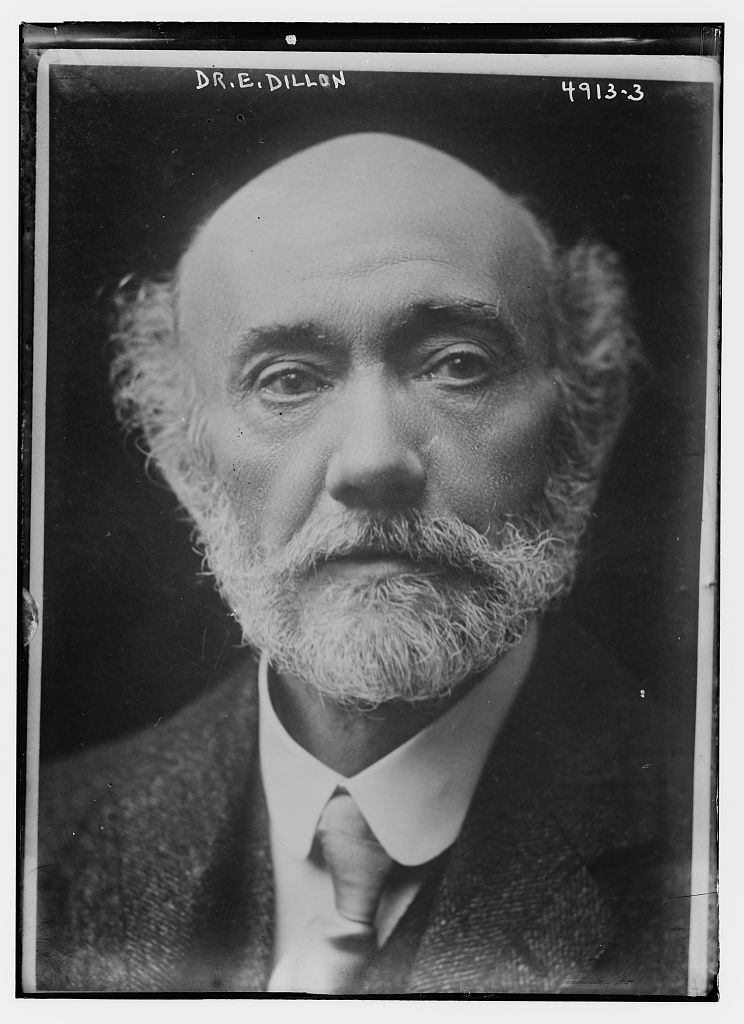
- Dillon circa 1919
- Born: 21 March 1854; Dublin, Ireland
- Died: 9 June 1933 (aged 79); Barcelona, Spain
- Education: Collège de France; Catholic University of Leuven
- Occupations: Journalist, Linguist
- Spouse(s): Yelena Maksimovna Bogachova (1881–1913) div. Kathleen Ireland (1914–1933)
- Children: 4

Emile Joseph Dillon (21 March 1854 – 9 June 1933) was an Irish author, journalist and linguist.

== Biography ==
He was born on 21 March 1854 in Dublin, Ireland, the son of an Irish father and an English mother.

Dillon initially trained for the priesthood; however, he abandoned all plans for a career in the church when he was 21, and immersed himself in the study of Oriental languages at the Collège de France in Paris. He later was awarded the degree of Doctor of Philosophy by the University of Leipzig, and obtained two further doctorates, in Oriental Languages and Literature from the Catholic University of Leuven, and in Comparative Philology from the University of Kharkiv.

He was Russian correspondent of The Daily Telegraph from 1887 to 1914 and, for a short time, was professor of Sanskrit, Classical Armenian, and Comparative Philology at the University of Kharkiv. He was a friend and associate of the Russian statesman Sergei Witte, whom he accompanied in 1905 to the peace conference at Portsmouth, New Hampshire which formally brought to an end the Russo-Japanese War. He also reported the Dreyfus trial of 1899, the Boxer Rebellion in 1900, and the Versailles peace conference in 1919. When working as a journalist, Dillon occasionally disguised himself in order to observe the action from closer quarters, as was the case when he was sent by The Daily Telegraph to report on the Turkish massacres of Armenians in 1894–1895.

He sometimes used the pseudonym E.B.Lanin, probably indicating "Dubliner"- Eblana is the Latin for Dublin and the ending "-in" is a nominal ending as in Lenin, Stalin etc.

He married his first wife, Yelena Maksimovna Bogachova, a widow, by whom he had four sons, in 1881. They divorced in 1913. His second wife was Kathleen Ireland, formerly of Belfast, whom he married in 1914 and who survived him. In later life he made his home in Barcelona.

He died of complications following a major surgical operation on 9 June 1933 in Barcelona, Spain.

== Legacy ==
An archive collection of papers of E.J. Dillon is held in the National Library of Scotland (Acc.12382).

A biography Dillon Rediscovered: The Newspaperman Who Befriended Kings, Presidents and Oil Tycoons by Kevin Rafter was published in 2025.

There is a portrait of Dillon by William Orpen in the National Gallery of Ireland.

== Bibliography ==
E.J. Dillon was a prolific writer in a variety of fields. Among his many publications are the following:

- The Sceptics of the Old Testament: Job - Koheleth - Agur. London: Isbister & Co., 1895.
- Maxim Gorky: His Life and Writings. London: Isbister & Co., 1902.
- The Original Poem of Job. London: T. Fisher Unwin Ltd., 1905.
- A Scrap of Paper: The Inner History of German Diplomacy and Her Scheme of World-Wide Conquest. London: Hodder & Stoughton, 1914.
- From the Triple to the Quadruple Alliance: Why Italy Went to War. London: Hodder & Stoughton, 1915.
- Ourselves and Germany. London: Chapman & Hall, 1916.
- The Eclipse of Russia. London: J.M. Dent & Sons Ltd., 1918.
- The Peace Conference. London: Hutchinson & Co.,1919.
- Mexico on the Verge. London, Hutchinson & Co., 1921."Read online".
- Russia Today and Yesterday: An Impartial View of Soviet Russia. London: J.M. Dent & Sons Ltd., 1929.
- Leaves from Life. London: J.M. Dent & Sons Ltd., 1932.
- Count Leo Tolstoy: A New Portrait. London: Hutchinson & Co., 1934.

He also published English translations of various works by Leo Tolstoy.
