= R. A. H. Bickford-Smith =

British barrister, historian and antiquary (1859-1916)

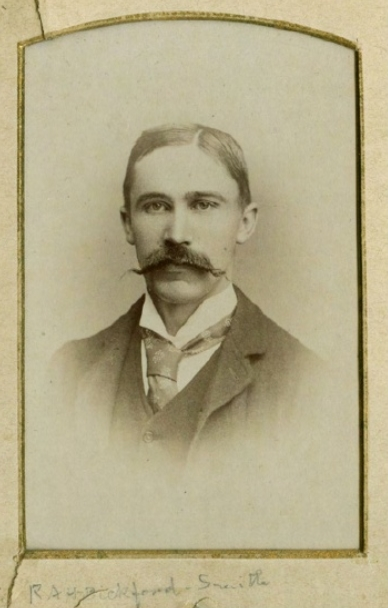
R. A. H. Bickford-Smith

Roandeau Albert Henry Bickford-Smith FSA (3 May 1859 – 1916) was an English barrister and antiquary. He is best known as the author of Greece under King George (1893), a work that was once considered a standard reference on 19th century Greek history.

== Early life ==
Roandeau Albert Henry Bickford-Smith was born in Trevarno on 3 May 1859, the son of William Bickford-Smith (1827–99), Member of Parliament for Truro, Cornwall. He graduated in law from Trinity College, Cambridge, in 1883, and received his Masters of Arts degree in 1886.

== Career ==
Bickford-Smith became a member of the Inner Temple in 1882 and was called to the bar in 1886.

His 1893 book, Greece under King George was translated into Greek in 1993.

He was a fellow of the Society of Antiquaries of London.

== Family ==
In 1891, Bickford-Smith married Caroline Louise Marianne Skinner (1873–1936). They had three children, John Allan, William Nugent Venning and Aubrey Luis.

== Death ==
Bickford-Smith died in 1916.

== Selected publications ==
- Greece under King George. R. Bentley, London, 1893.
- Cretan Sketches. London: Richard Bentley and Son. 1898 – via Internet Archive.
