= Auguste Salzmann =

French archaeologist and painter

- Born: 14 April 1824; Ribeauvillé, Alsace, France
- Died: 24 February 1872 (aged 47); Paris
- Known for: Photography

Auguste Salzmann (1824–1872) was a French archaeologist, painter, and pioneer in the field of archaeological photography.

== Life and career ==
Salzmann was born into a wealthy family of entrepreneurs from Alsace. He was a friend of painter and writer Eugène Fromentin, with whom he travelled in 1847 to Algeria. In 1851, while in Egypt, Salzmann met with Egyptologist Auguste Mariette and developed a particular interest in his work.

Salzmann, who was a painter of landscapes and religious scenes, also became one of the first to use photography as a means of archaeological study. He is, together with Louis De Clercq, the most important photographer from the time of calotype whose work is not defined by Egyptology. His 1854 Jerusalem images are inspired by the work of archaeologist Félix de Saulcy.

In 1853 Salzmann applied for a government assignment for researching the buildings of the Knights Hospitaller from the Island of Rhodes. When he departed on 12 December 1853, his actual target was not Rhodes anymore, but Jerusalem. In the meantime he had become interested in a scientific debate regarding, at its core, the age of the walls of Jerusalem. The debate had been kicked off in 1852 by de Saulcy, who had expanded on it in his 1853 book, Voyage autour de la Mer Morte (lit. 'Travels Around the Dead Sea'). Salzmann, who was acquainted to Saulcy, had a spontaneous change of heart and modified his travel plans: "I have changed my travel destination in the belief of making a true service to science. I have researched all the monuments of Jerusalem and photographed mainly those whose origin has been under dispute." Salzmann stayed for four months in Jerusalem, gathering almost 200 images, until being forced by a fever to return to France.

The most prominent images from his photo book Jerusalem, which includes a total of 174 photographs, are without doubt the depictions of architecture details and the excavation findings. These he brought back and presented as hard facts in the running dispute of the time. Salzmann managed to combine his skills as a painter with his scientific acumen as an archaeologist. The publication also contains views of Jerusalem, the Valley of Josaphat, and Bethlehem. Salzmann's images are aesthetically richer when compared, from today's perspective, to the classical approach of his contemporary, Maxime Du Camp. The photo book was published in 1856 and marketed for a price which was, at that time, completely out of bounds: over 1400 Francs. Less of a commercial success than Du Camp's book, it was mainly targeting an archaeologically interested public whose curiosity in such topics had substantially decreased lately.

In 1860, the magazine Le Tour du monde published the images as woodcuts.

== Publications ==
- Jérusalem: Études et reproductions photographiques de la Ville Sainte depuis l'époque judaïque jusqu'à nos jours (4 volumes; Gide et Baudry, Paris 1856); available at Gallica.
- Nécropole de Camiros. Journal des fouilles exécutées dans cette nécropole pendant les années 1858 à 1865 (A. Detaille, Paris 1875); available at Gallica.

== Bibliography ==
- Photographies de la Terre Sainte par Auguste Salzmann, in: Félix de Saulcy et la Terre Sainte. Paris, 1982.
- Abigail Solomon-Godeau: A Photographer in Jerusalem, 1855: Auguste Salzmann and His Times. The MIT Press, 1981.
