= Robert Schneider (disambiguation) =

Robert Schneider (born 1971) is an American pop/rock musician.

Robert Schneider may also refer to:

- Robert Schneider (writer) (born 1961), Austrian writer
- Robert Schneider (cyclist) (born 1944), American cyclist
- Robert Schneider (journalist) (born 1976), German journalist
- Robert Schneider (painter) (1809–1885), German portrait painter
- Bob Schneider (children's music) (born 1955), Canadian musician, lead singer of Bob Schneider and the Rainbow Kids
- Bob Schneider (born 1965), American musician, former lead singer of Ugly Americans
- Bob Schneider (basketball) (born 1938), American basketball coach
- Rob Schneider (born 1963), American actor and comedian

== See also ==
- Schneider (surname)
- Robert von Schneider (1854–1909), Austrian classical archaeologist
