= Bibasis (dance) =

Dance from Ancient Sparta

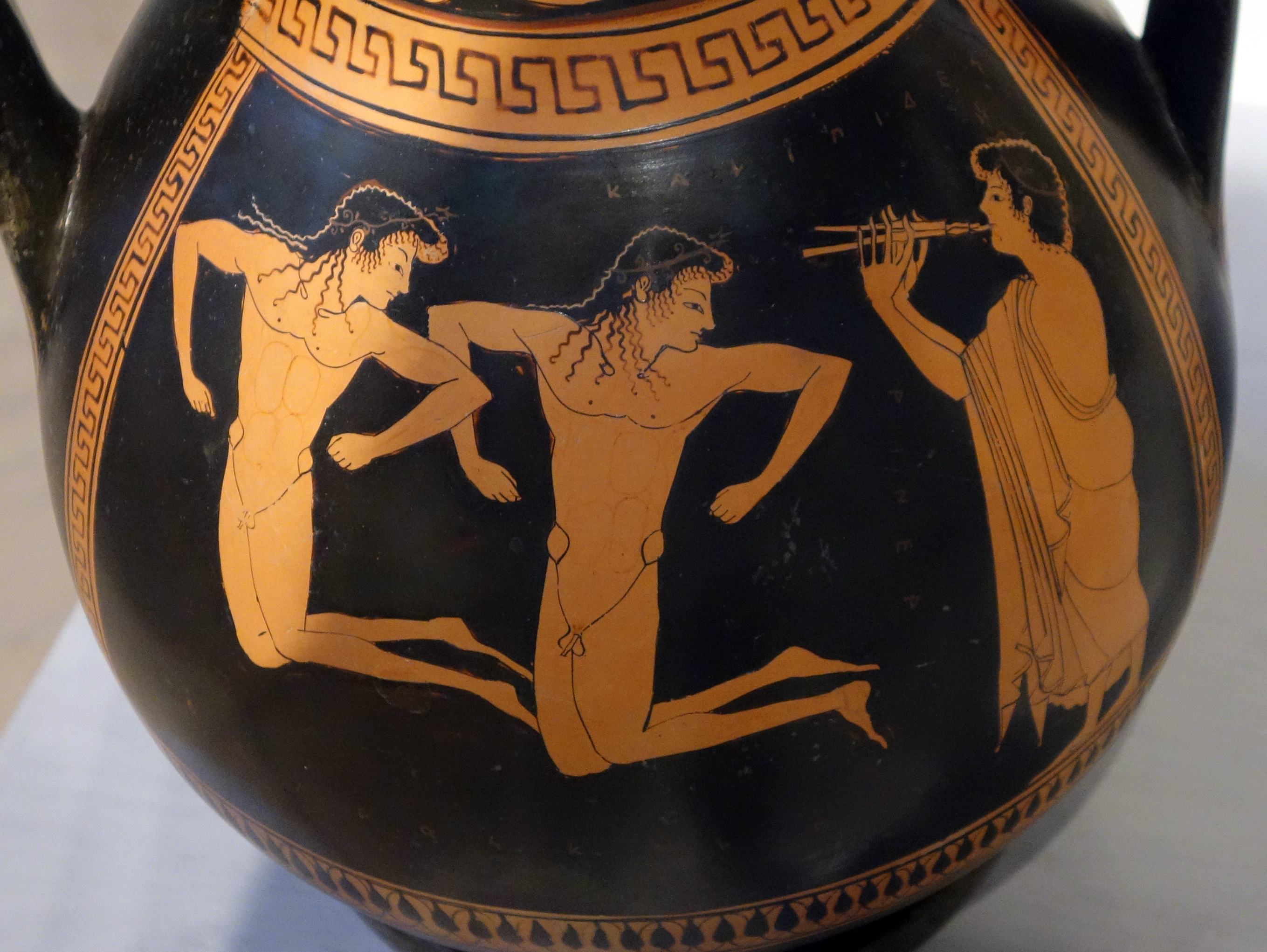
Detail of a pelike, c. 520–515 BC, by the circle of Euthymides, depicting young male athletes dancing and jumping to the aulos. The scene may represent the Greek competitive dance exercise called bibasis, a Laconian dance for both boys and girls.

The Bibasis (Ancient Greek: βίβασις, romanized: bíbasis) was a common dance in ancient Sparta, which was much practised both by men and women.

== History ==
The Bibasis, a dance of men and women, was of the gymnastic kind. The dance consisted in springing rapidly from the ground, and striking the feet behind; a feat of which the Spartan woman Lampito, in the Lysistrata of Aristophanes, prides herself. She derives her strength and her beauty essentially from this exercise.

μάλα γ' οἰῶ, ναὶ τὼ σιώ· γυμνάδδομαί γα καὶ ποτὶ πυγὰν ἅλλομαι.
It's true, I think, by the Twin Gods. I do take exercise, and I jump-kick my butt.

The dance consisted in kicking one's own buttocks, to music, as rapidly as possible. The number of successful strokes was counted, and the most skilful received prizes in competitions. We are told by a verse from an epigram, which has been preserved by Pollux, that a Laconian girl had won by dancing the Bibasis a thousand times, which was more than had ever been done before.

χήλι' ἅδε ποκὰ βίβαντι, πλεῖστα δὴ τᾶν πήποκα. (Note: The text of the verse as preserved in the manuscripts of Pollux (χίλια ποκὰ βίβαντι, πλεῖστα δὴ τῶν πήποκα) is corrupt and unmetrical. Various attempts have been made to restore it; the version reproduced here is that of Preger 1891.)
This girl once jumped a thousand times, the most ever.

== Sources ==
- Lawler, Lillian B. (1964). The Dance in Ancient Greece. Middletown, CT: Wesleyan University Press. p. 121.
- Müller, C. O. (1830). The History and Antiquities of the Doric Race. Vol. 2. Tufnell, Henry, and Lewis, George Cornewall (trans.). Oxford: S. Collingwood. pp. 351–352.
- Preger, Theodor. (1891). Inscriptiones graecae metricae ex scriptoribus praeter Anthologiam collectae. Leipzig: Teubner. pp. 107–108, no. 134.
- Raftis, Alkis, ed. "βίβασις, bibasis, vivasis". Encyclopedia of Ancient Greek Dance. International Dance Council CID. Accessed 10 July 2022.
- Reisch, Emil (1896). "Bibasis (2)". In Wissowa, Georg (ed.). Paulys Realencyclopädie der classischen Altertumswissenschaft. Vol. 3: Barbarus–Campanus. Stuttgart: Metzler. pp. 390–391.
- Roebuck, Mary C., and Roebuck, Carl A. (April–June 1955). "A Prize Aryballos". Hesperia: The Journal of the American School of Classical Studies at Athens, 24(2): pp. 158–163.
- Sider, David (December 2021). "Pyrwias Leading the Dance". Antichistica, 31. Edizioni Ca’Foscari. pp. 115–129.
- Smith, William (1890). "Saltatio". In Smith, William; Wayte, William; Marindin, G. E. (eds.). A Dictionary of Greek and Roman Antiquities. 3rd ed. London: John Murray. p. 594.
- Snodgrass, Mary Ellen (2016). The Encyclopedia of World Folk Dance. Lanham, MD: Rowman & Littlefield. pp. 112, 119.
- Threatte, Leslie (1967). "An Interpretation of a Sixth-Century Corinthian Dipinto". Glotta, 45(3/4): pp. 186–194.
- "Two-handled storage jar (pelike) depicting young athletes jumping". Museum of Fine Arts, Boston. Accessed 10 July 2022.
