= Robert Schneider (painter) =

German painter

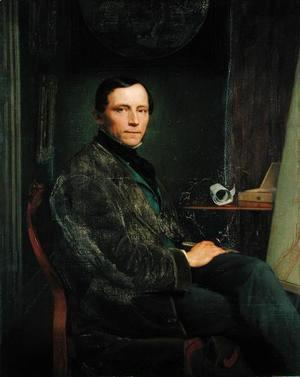
Self-portrait (1856)

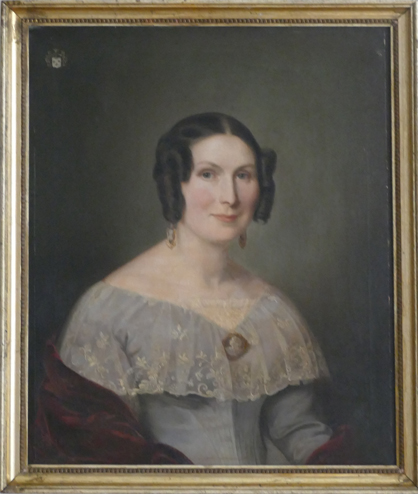
Portrait of Helene Franziska Binder

Robert Schneider (25 February 1809, Dresden - 21 October 1885, Hamburg) was a German portrait painter who worked in Hamburg and Lübeck. He was one of the first portraitists in that area to move from the earlier Romanticised style to more nearly pictorial representations.

== Life and work ==
He was the son of a Court Counselor and studied at the Dresden Academy of Fine Arts with Heinrich Gotthold Arnold. In 1832, he made the acquaintance of the art historian, Carl Friedrich von Rumohr, who became his patron and convinced him to relocate to Northern Germany. Over the next decade, he visited Schleswig (1834), Plön (1835, 1837, 1841) and Kiel (1836, 1840). An extended study trip in 1842 took him to Italy, via Paris.

Most of his subjects were notable members of the Hanseatic bourgeoisie and merchant classes. Among his most familiar portraits is one of Helene Franziska Binder, daughter of the actor and director, Friedrich Ludwig Schmidt and wife of Nicolaus Binder, the Mayor of Hamburg. He was also a member of the Hamburger Künstlerverein.

In 1928, a large number of his paintings were part of the exhibition "Hamburger Bildnisse" at the Staatliche Kunstsammlungen Dresden. A major retrospective of his work was included in "Hamburger Schule – Das 19. Jahrhundert neu entdeckt", in 2019 at the Hamburger Kunsthalle. His works may be seen at the Behnhaus in Lübeck and the Hamburger Kunsthalle.
