= Steiner Tor =

Coordinates: 48°24′35″N 15°35′47″E

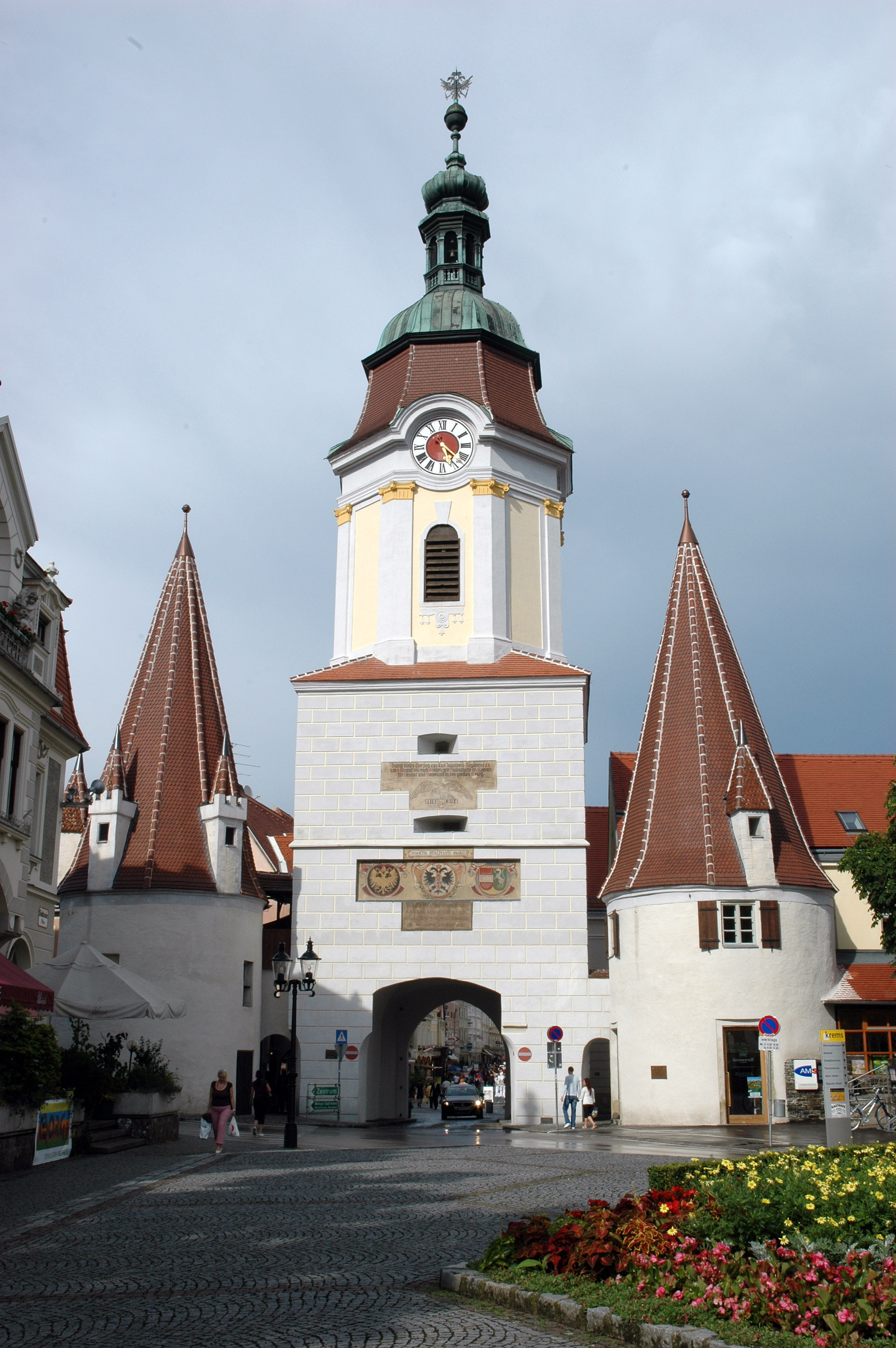
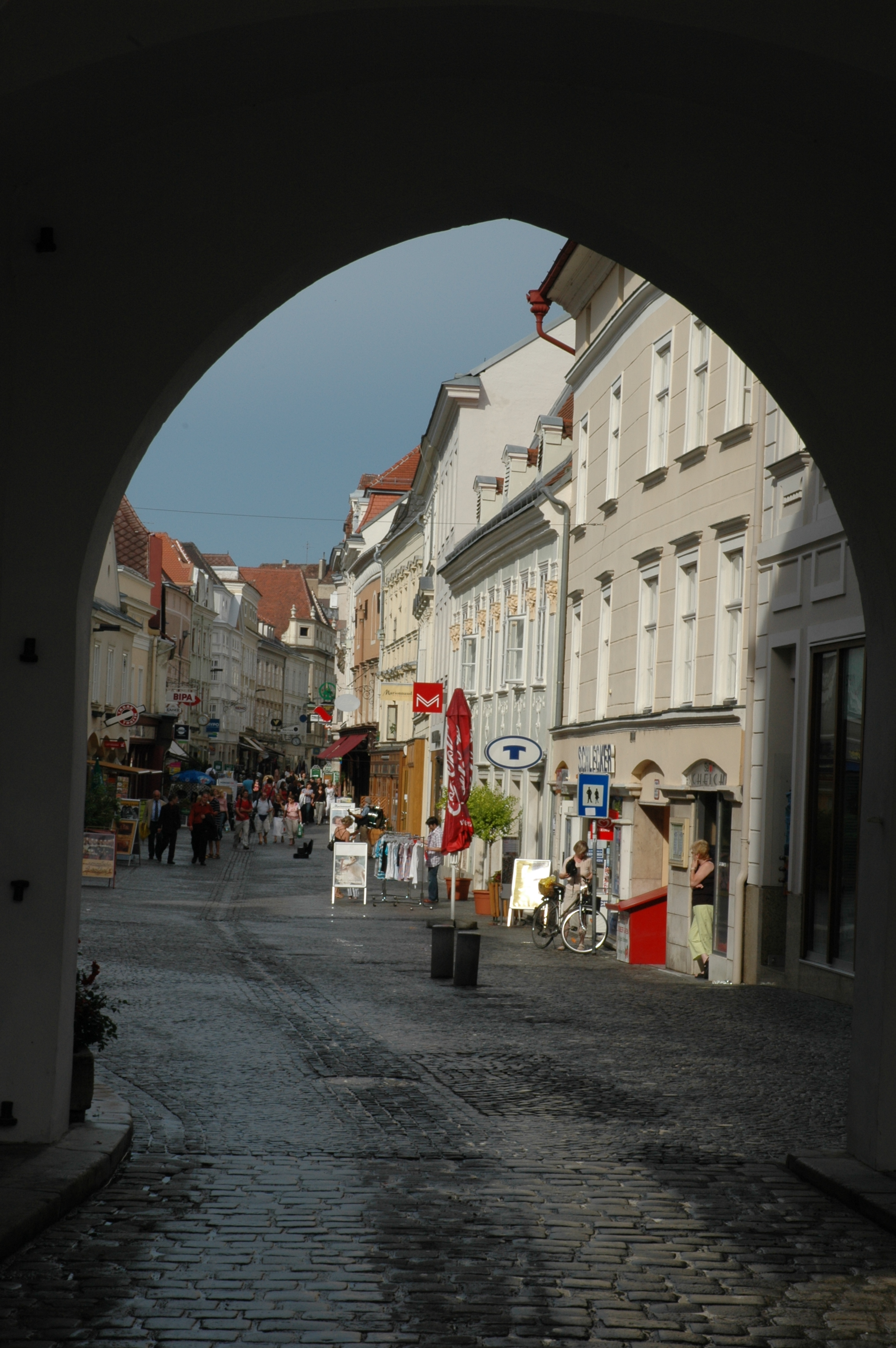
Left: Steiner Tor. Right: Landscape of Steiner Tor.

Steiner Tor is a preserved gate, originally built in the late 15th century but refashioned in the Baroque style in the city of Krems an der Donau, in the Wachau valley of Austria. It is considered the symbol of the city. Until the last third of the 19th century, the city of Krems was surrounded by a wall. This was systematically razed, and three gates were also removed. From 2005, celebrating the 700-year anniversary of the city rights, the Steiner Tor was restored as much to its original as possible.

Outside the portal are towers flanking both sides, which, like the lower floor of the gate, date from the late Middle Ages. On the right of the archway is a small stone coat of arms mentioning Emperor Friedrich III, and the year 1480 in Roman numerals. This is believed to date the restoration of the fortifications that had become necessary because of the destruction wrought by Hungarian troops in 1477. The tower building dates from much more recently, and dates to the Baroque period during the reign of Maria Theresa, 1756. Outside the gate, the Steiner Tor was originally threatened by flooding from the Danube. On the inner side of the stone door is a mounted memorial which commemorates such a disaster in 1573. In the immediate vicinity of the Steiner Tor is a shopping centre.

On 1 February 1960, Österreichische Post issued a definitive stamp with a value of 3.40 schillings on a postage stamp.
