= Rudolf Redlinghofer =

Austrian conscientious objector executed by Nazi Germany (1900–1940)

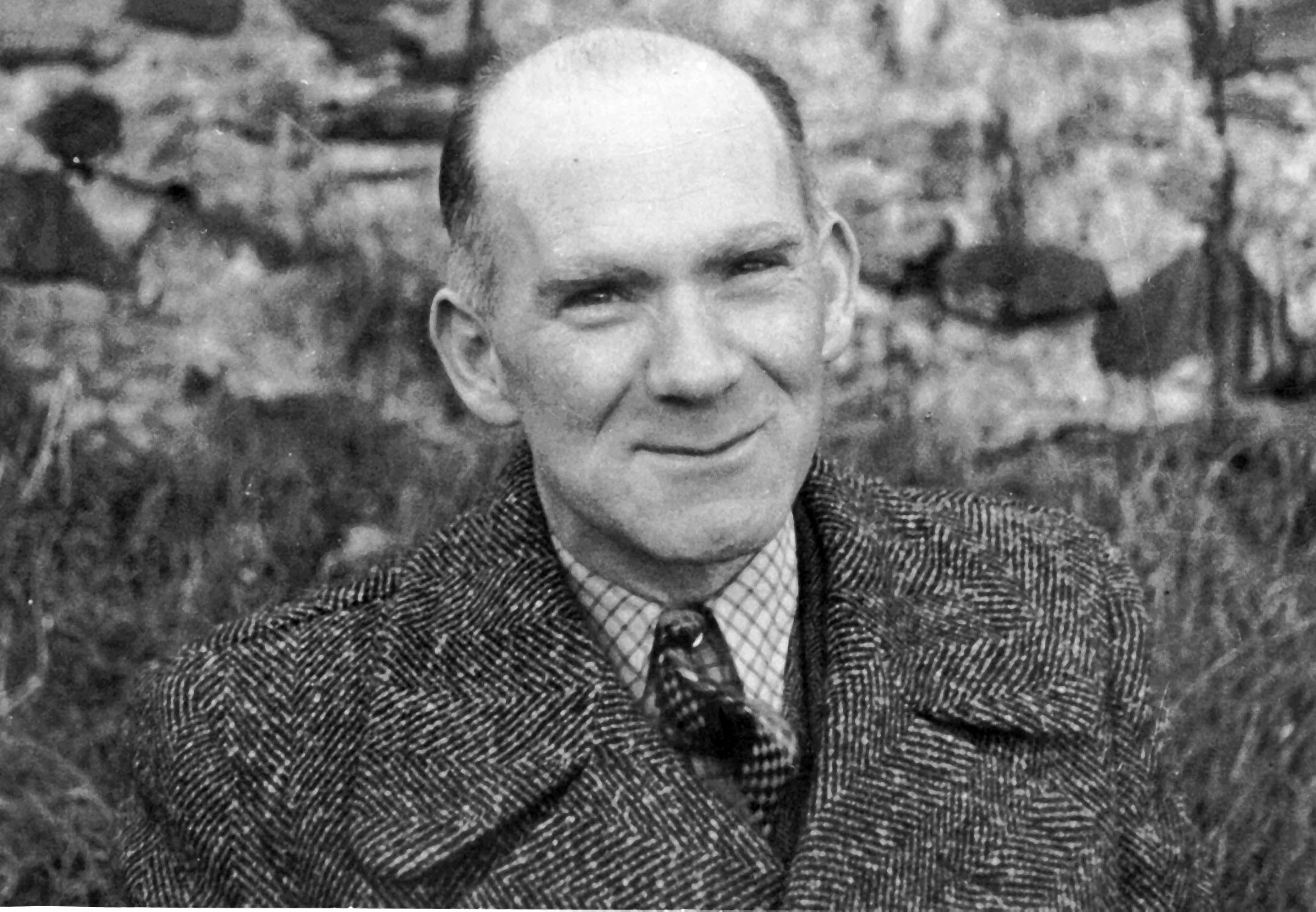
Rudolf Redlinghofer

Rudolf Redlinghofer (31 October 1900 – 11 January 1940) was an Austrian conscientious objector and victim of the Nazi regime. The Republic of Austria reversed his sentence 58 years after his execution, and Rudolf Redlinghofer became one of the first victims of the regime to be rehabilitated in Austria.

== Arrest ==
Born in Vienna-Alservorstadt, and living in Krems an der Donau, Rudolf Redlinghofer was a Jehovah's Witness (also then known as an Ernest Bible Student). He refused military service due to his conscientious conviction.

On 18 August 1939 he was arrested by the Gendarmerie of Krems on an order issued by the Gestapo Division-St. Pölten and was imprisoned in Krems. On the following day he was transferred to the Gestapo Division-St. Pölten. At first in St. Pölten attempts were made to break his resistance: his wife was ordered to stand with their small daughter Regina in front of the courtroom, to put pressure on him to change his mind as he was led past them. However, Rudolf Redlinghofer remained determined in his conviction to obey God rather than man.

== Trial ==
In consequence, on 13 November 1939 he was transferred to the Investigative Prison Alt-Moabit in Berlin. He was tried at the Supreme Reichs War Court on 9 December 1939; the 3rd Senate of the Reichs War Court (Reichskriegsgericht), with Councilor Dr. Burckhardt as Prosecutor, sentenced him to death, plus lifetime loss of military honours and civil rights, for undermining military defence. According to the record, there was no Defender present.

The decision was signed according to law by Schmauser, von Goeldel, Schrot, Büscher and Block. The President of the Reichs War Court confirmed the decision on 21 December 1939. Rudolf Redlinghofer was transferred to Berlin Plötzensee Prison, arriving there on 30 December 1939.

== Execution and consequences ==
On 11 January 1940, after just a few days in Berlin-Ploetzensee Prison, he was escorted to the place of execution. After the court decision was read again, Rudolf Redlinghofer, with his hands tied behind his back, was laid on the guillotine and beheaded. The Reichs War Court notified the Military Conscription Office in Krems of his execution on 12 January. For his wife, Agnes, and their 2-year-old daughter began a very difficult time. Agnes Redlinghofer attempted to support herself and her daughter as house-keeper and cook at an inn. She later moved to Heinemann Strasse 5, and lived there until her own death in 1987. Agnes Redlinghofer often spoke to her daughter and grandchildren about her husband's conscientious conviction as a Jehovah's Witness, and how highly she esteemed his decision not to support Hitler's obsession with power.

== Rudolf's suit saved Peter Goelles ==
Peter Goelles – was imprisoned in Stein near Krems. On 6 April 1945, because of the approach of Russian troops, all prisoners were to be set free and the prison vacated. During the morning, the release of prisoners took place without trouble, but in the afternoon it turned into what is called the Massacre of Stein. The order was given to hunt down all released prisoners and execute them. As a result, many prisoners were not only murdered in Krems, but it also came to mass shootings in Hadersdorf-Kammern on the Kamp, Hörfarth, Paudorf and other places. Peter Goelles was able to leave the prison in Stein and, using back streets, found his way to Agnes Redlinghofer's apartment in Krems. Agnes gave him a suit from her late husband, and wearing it, Peter Goelles was able to escape the Massacre and arrive safely back in Vienna.

== Rehabilitation ==
Rudolf Redlinghofer was rehabilitated by the Republic of Austria 58 years after his execution. On 14 October 1998 the Viennese District Court reversed the former unjust Nazi decision. Moreover, it also substantiates the fact, that loyally upholding one's conscientious conviction is not a crime.

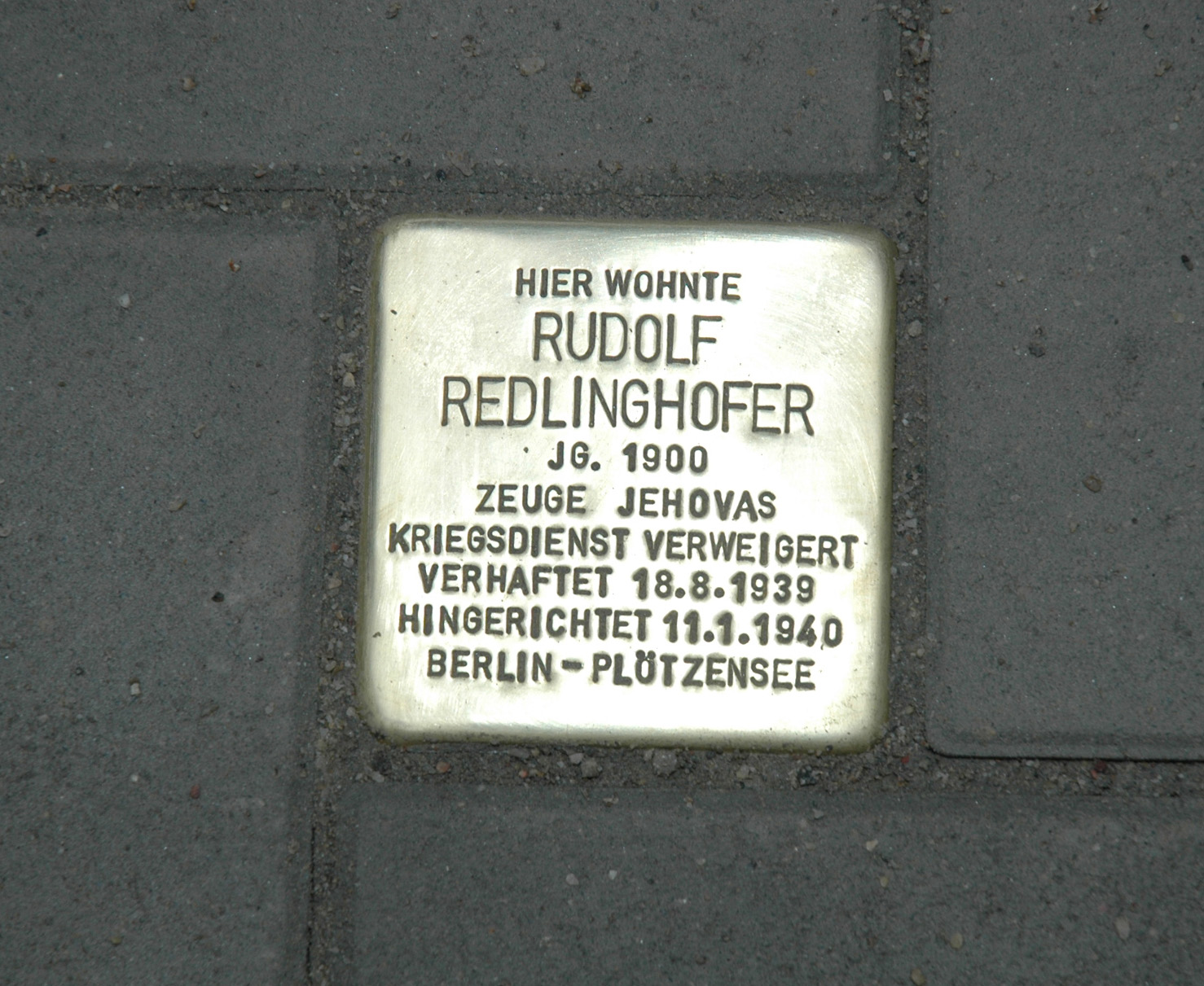
Stolperstein für Rudolf Redlinghofer

== Stumbling block for Redlinghofer ==
On 23 June 2009 a "stumbling block" (Stolperstein) was installed by Gunter Demnig at Spitalgasse 3 in Krems an der Donau, the site of the house where Rudolf Redlinghofer lived together with his wife Agnes and his daughter Regina. The house has gone, but the block was put at the original place in memory of a man who stood firm in his faith and remained true to his principles.
