= Franz Schneider (chemist) =

Austrian physician and chemist

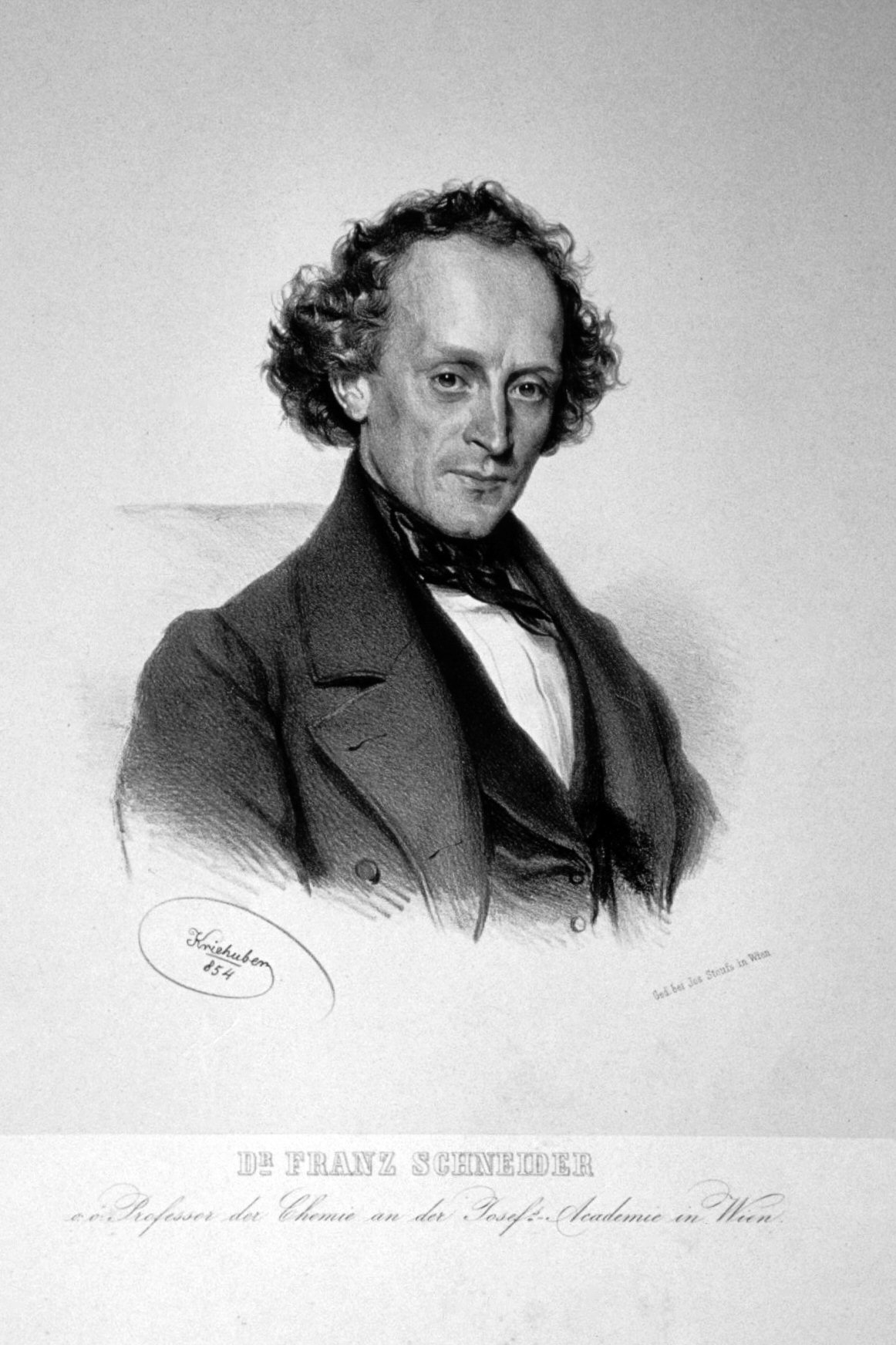
Franz Cölestin Schneider (1854)

Franz Cölestin Schneider (28 September 1812, in Krems – 29 November 1897) was an Austrian physician and chemist. He was the father of archaeologist Robert von Schneider (1854–1909).

He studied medicine at the University of Vienna, obtaining his medical doctorate in 1842, and his doctorate in surgery during the following year. For the next few years, he served as a general practitioner in the town of Herzogenburg, followed by work as an assistant to chemist Adolf Martin Pleischl (1787–1867) in Vienna.

In 1850 he received his doctorate in special inorganic and organic chemistry at Vienna. Two years later he was named professor of surgical sciences at the Josephinum in Vienna, where he taught classes in physics, chemistry and natural history. In 1870 he succeeded Josef Redtenbacher (1810-1870) in the department of general and medical chemistry at the University of Vienna. During the following year, he suffered eye damage due to an accident in the laboratory. In February 1876, he was named with the rank of undersecretary to the Ministry of the Interior.

Schneider is credited for introducing forensic toxicology in Austria. He developed new methods for detecting arsenic and mercury in the human body.

== Selected writings ==
- Die gerichtliche Chemie, für Gerichtsaerzte und Juristen bearb., 1852. - Forensic chemistry, for doctors and lawyers.
- Anfangsgründe der Chemie, 1853 - First principles of chemistry.
- Commentar zur neuen österreichischen Pharmacopöe, 1855 - Commentary on the new Austrian pharmacopoeia.
