= Johann Nordmann =

Austrian journalist and travel writer

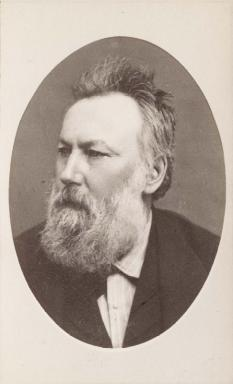
Johannes Nordmann 1820- 1887

Johann Nordmann (born Rumpelmayer, also published as Johannes Nordmann and under the pseudonym H. Naudh, 13 March 1820 in Landersdorf, now Krems an der Donau – 20 August 1887 in Vienna) was an Austrian journalist and travel writer.

== Life ==
Little is known about his life, as much of his work was published under pseudonyms. It is possible he was related to the Austrian-Hungarian architect Viktor Rumpelmayer (1830–1885).

== Works ==
Nordmann's most enduring work is the poem/serenade "Kling leise, mein Lied" set by several composers including Franz Liszt in 1848.

It is unclear if Nordmann is the author behind the 1861 work "Jews and the German State," (Die Juden und der deutsche Staat) published under the pseudonym H. Naudh. The work was one of the few overtly antisemitic works of the 1860s and was regarded as a classic in the genre. It went through twelve editions before 1820 and was adopted and revised by antisemitic publisher Theodor Fritsch. Fritsch questioned Nordmann's authorship of the book, believing it to be written at the behest of or perhaps revised by Lothar Bucher, soon to become an aide to Otto von Bismarck and Hermann Wagener, a ranking member of the Prussian Conservative party. The work argued against Jewish emancipation.

- Carrara a historical novel from ancient Padua, Leipzig: Brockhaus, 1851
- Dante's Zeitalter (Dante's Times), a preliminary study to a comprehensive work about Dante, 1852
- Kling leise, mein Lied Serenade. Second edition, 1860
- "My Sundays" Travel journal from the Austrian high Alps, Vienna: 1868
- Unterwegs (On route) Continuation of the hiking book, "My Sundays" Berlin: Angel, 1884

== Bibliography ==
- E. Lebensaft: "Nordmann Johann". In: Österreichisches Biographisches Lexikon 1815–1950 (ÖBL). Vol. 7, Austrian Academy of Sciences, Vienna 1978, ISBN 3-7001-0187-2, p. 150 f. (Direct links to "p. 150", "p. 151")
- Robert F. Arnold (1906). "Nordmann, Johann" . Allgemeine Deutsche Biographie (in German). Vol. 52. Leipzig: Duncker & Humblot. pp. 656–659.
- Leopold Schmidt, Die Entdeckung des Burgenlandes im Biedermeier. Studien zur Geistesgeschichte und Volkskunde Ostösterreichs im 19. Jahrhundert (- Johann Nordmann) Burgenländisches Landesmuseum, Eisenstadt 1959.
- Helmuth Furch, Historisches Lexikon Kaisersteinbruch. 2 Volumes. Museums- und Kulturverein, Kaisersteinbruch 2002–2004.
