= Emil Reisch =

Austrian classical philologist and archaeologist

Emil Reisch (28 September 1863, Vienna – 13 December 1933, Vienna) was an Austrian classical philologist and archaeologist.

== Biography ==
From 1881 he studied at the University of Vienna, where his instructors were Wilhelm von Hartel and Karl Schenkl for philology, and Otto Benndorf for classical archaeology. In 1886/87 he conducted archaeological research in Greece, and in 1888 he visited Italy. In 1890 he relocated to the University of Innsbruck as an associate professor of classical archaeology (full professor, 1894). In 1898 he succeeded Otto Benndorf as professor of archaeology at the University of Vienna, where later, he was appointed dean (1910/11) and rector (1916/17).

In 1907 he was named vice-director of the Austrian Archaeological Institute (ÖAI), where three years later, he replaced Robert von Schneider as director. Under his leadership, the institute conducted excavations at Elis (from 1910) and Aigeira (from 1914) in Greece, and resumed excavatory work at Ephesus in Asia Minor (from 1911). He also directed archaeological work to be done along the Adriatic coastlands and southern Alpine regions of the empire. After World War I, he was in charge of excavations at Carnuntum (Petronell-Carnuntum), Lauriacum (Enns) and Virunum (Zollfeld) in Austria.

== Selected works ==
- Griechische Weihgeschenke, 1890 – Greek votive offerings.
- Führer durch die öffentlichen Sammlungen klassischer Alterthümer in Rom, 1891 (main author: Wolfgang Helbig) – Guide to the public collections of classical antiquities in Rome.
- Die mykenische Frage, 1894 – The Mycenaean question.
- Das griechische Theater : Beitrage zur Geschichte des Dionysos-Theaters in Athen und anderer griechischer Theater (with Wilhelm Dörpfeld), 1896 – The Greek theater: contributions to the history of the Dionysus theater in Athens and other Greek theaters.
- Ithaka, 1896 – Ithaca.
- Athene Hephaistia, in: Jahreshefte des Österreichischen Archäologischen Institutes in Wien, vol. 1, 1898, pp. 55–93 – Hephesteum in Athens.
