= Michael Wutky =

Austrian painter

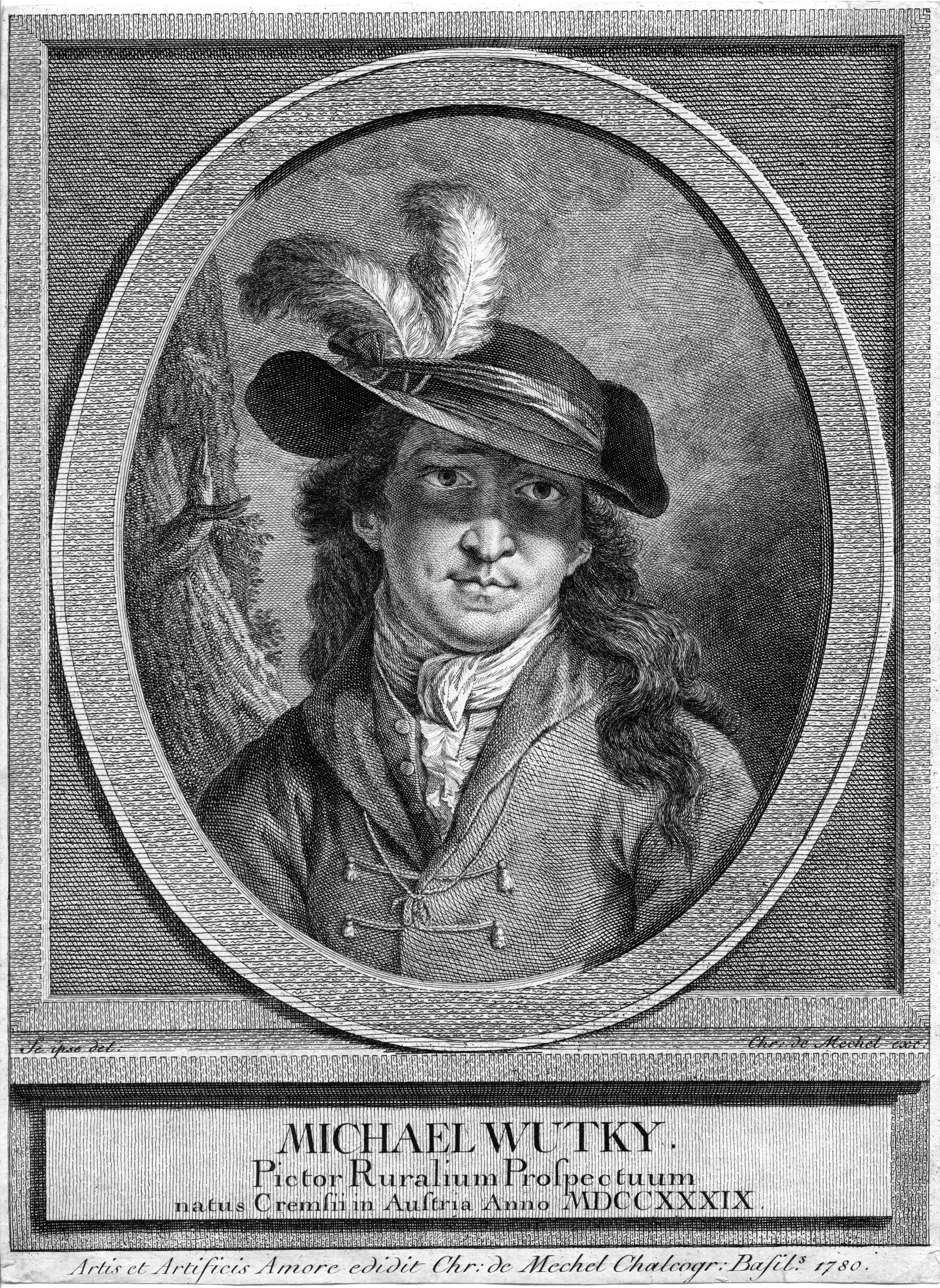
- Michael Wutky; portrait by Christian von Mechel
- Born: 1739
- Died: 28 September 1822 (aged 82–83); Vienna, Austrian Empire
- Known for: Painting
- Style: Rococo

Michael Wutky (1739 – 28 September 1822/23) was an Austrian landscape painter in the Rococo style who specialized in Italian scenes.

== Biography ==
Wutky was born in Krems an der Donau, Austria. In 1759, he studied at the Academy of Fine Arts, Vienna, with Martin van Meytens. He was originally a history painter, but was not very successful. In 1770, he became a member of the Vienna Academy and went to Italy on its behalf. Once there, he turned to landscape painting, which proved to be his true forté.

Wutky spent six years in Italy, mainly in Rome, from 1781 to 1787. He is best known for the paintings he produced during a stay in Naples. Mount Vesuvius was especially active at that time, and he took the opportunity to capture close-up scenes of the eruptions and lava flows. Accompanied by the English diplomat and volcanologist Sir William Hamilton, he even made risky trips close to the volcano's crater.

He later spent some time painting the ruins in Rome, then returned to Vienna, where he became a Professor at the academy. He revisited Italy for a short time in 1805, to collect new material. His stepbrother, Franz Neumann (1744-1816), the Director of the "Royal Coin and Antiquities Gallery", left him 40,000 Florins, but he continued to earn his living by painting. Many years earlier, Lord Bristol had offered to buy two of his Italian landscapes for 1,200 Ducats apiece, but died before the sale was completed.

Wutky died in Vienna.

== Paintings of Vesuvius ==
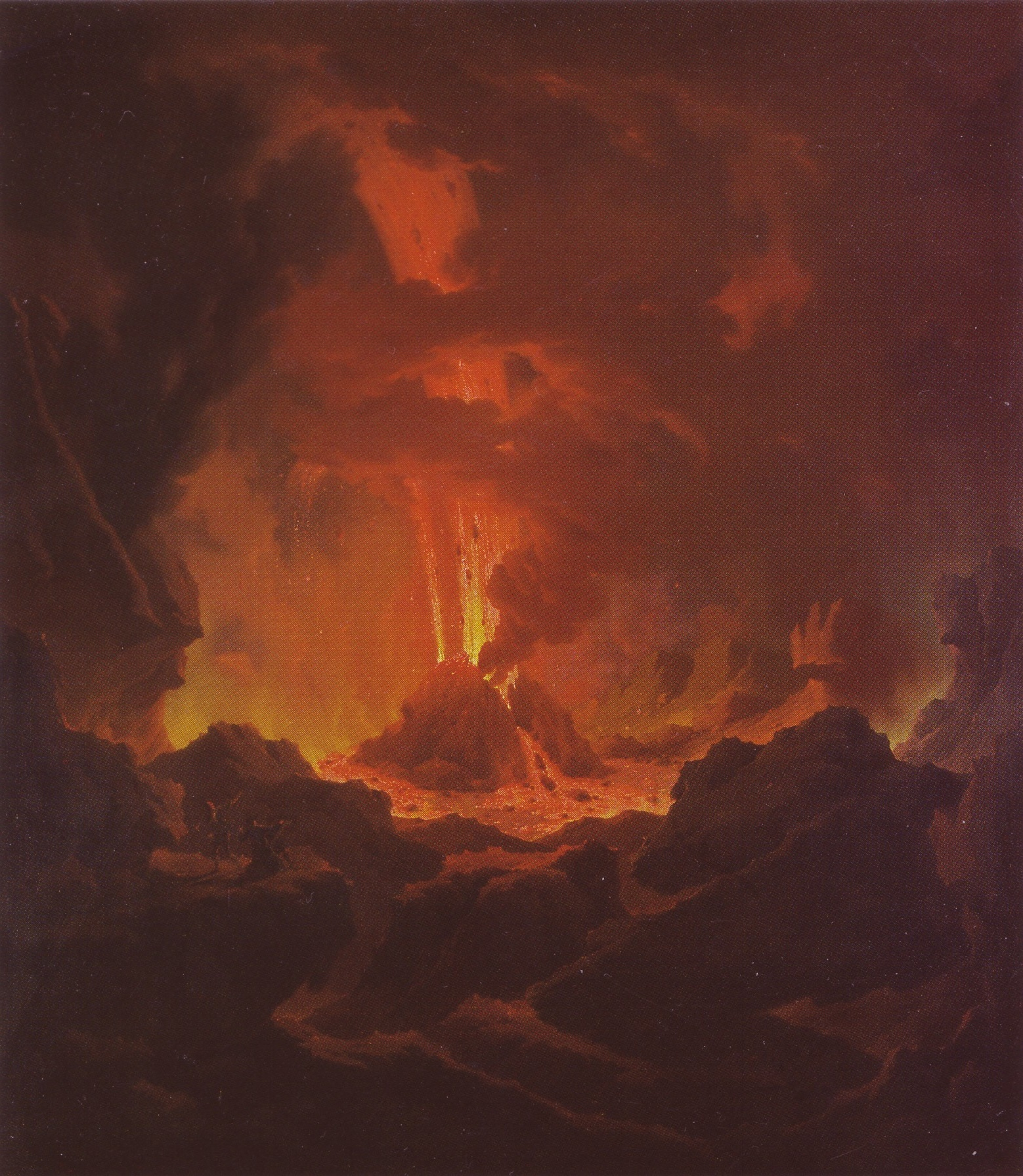
Eruption (close-up)

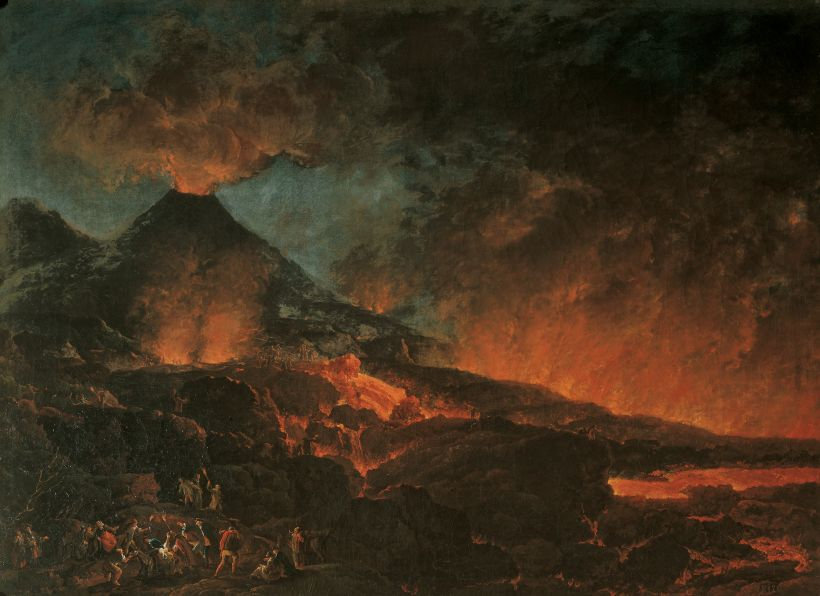
Eruption

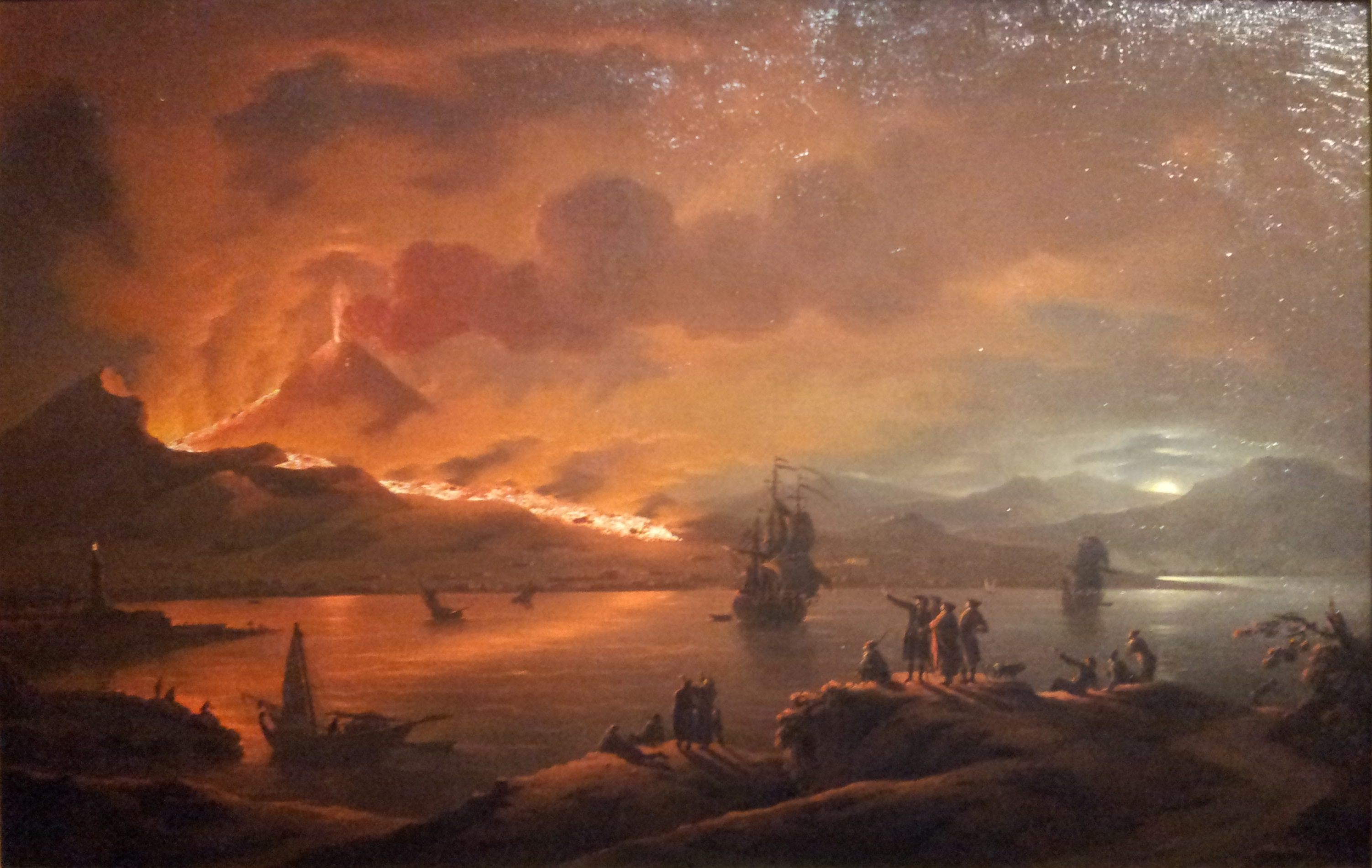
View from the Gulf of Naples

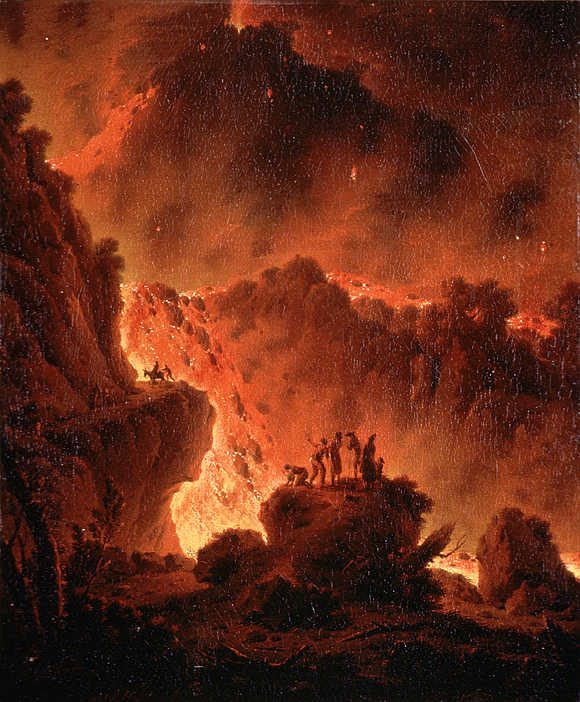
Lava Flow

== Collections ==
His work is included in the collections of the Philadelphia Museum of Art, the Kunstmuseum Basel and the Museum of Fine Arts Budapest.
