= Krems an der Donau =

Statutory city in Lower Austria, Austria

- Statutory city
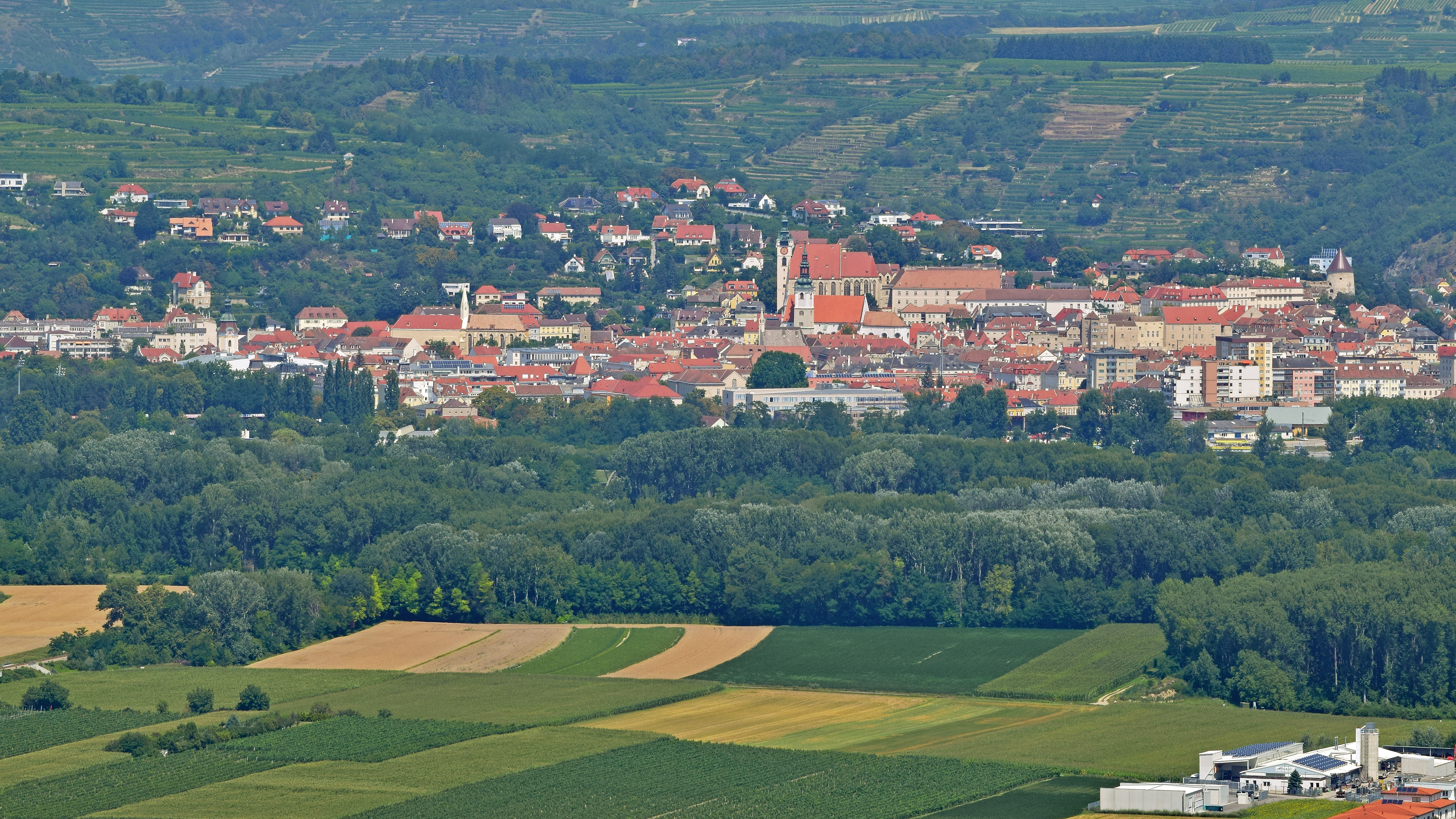
- View of Krems

- Flag Coat of arms

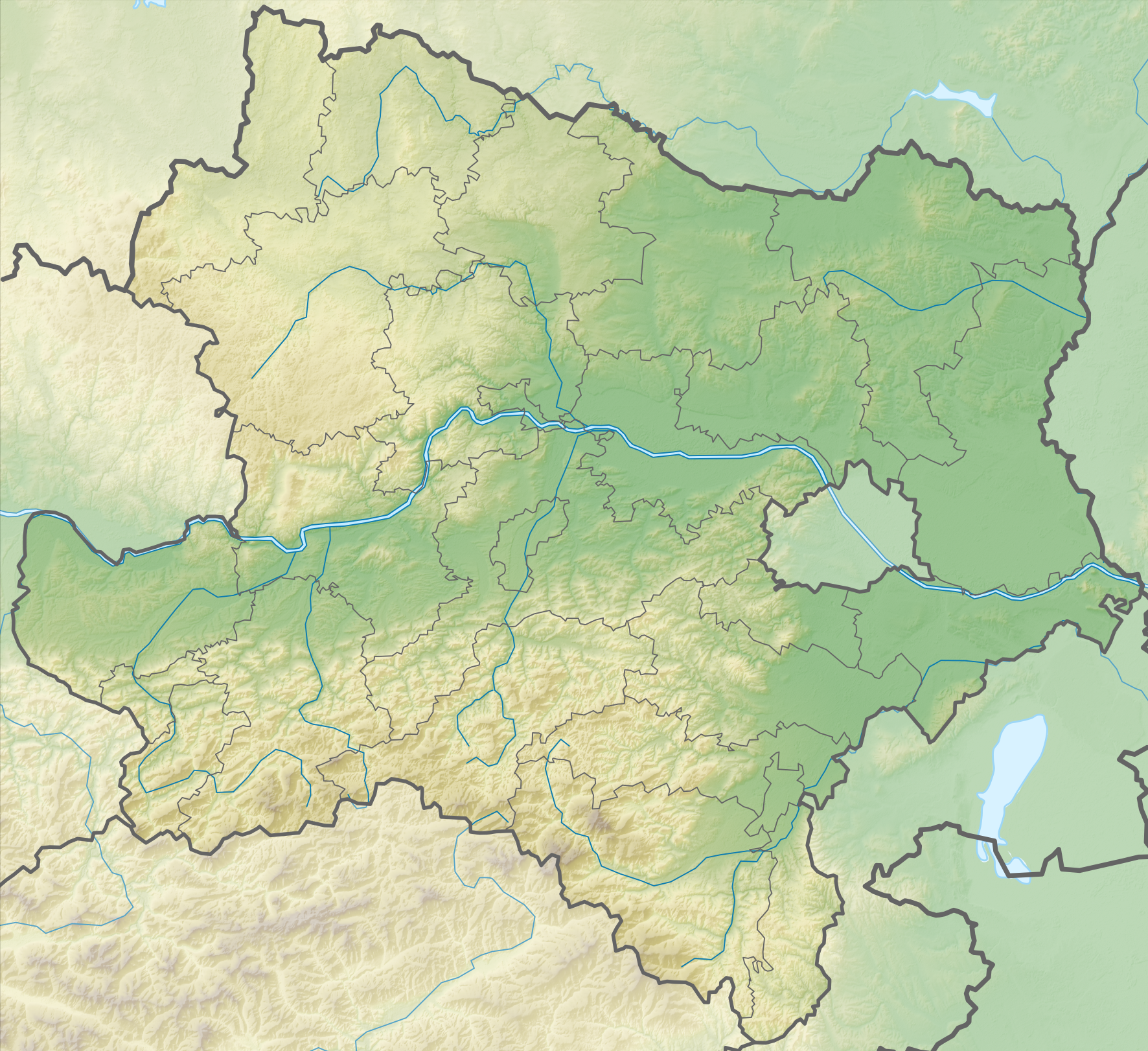
- Location within Lower Austria Location within Austria
- Coordinates: 48°25′N 15°37′E
- Country: Austria
- State: Lower Austria
- District: Statutory city
- Town rights: 1305

Government
  - Mayor: Peter Molnar (SPÖ)

Area
  - Statutory city: 51.66 km^{2} (19.95 sq mi)
- Elevation: 203 m (666 ft)

Population (2023-01-01)
  - Statutory city: 25,272
  - Density: 465/km^{2} (1,200/sq mi)
  - Urban: c. 50,000
- Time zone: UTC+1 (CET)
  - Summer (DST): UTC+2 (CEST)
- Postal code: 3500, 3506 (Krems-Süd)
- Area code: 02732, 02739 (Krems-Süd)
- License plate: KS
- Website: www.krems.at

Krems an der Donau (Austrian German pronunciation: [ˈkrɛms an deːɐ̯ ˈdoːnaʊ], lit. 'Krems on the Danube') is a city in Lower Austria, Austria. With a population of 24,821, it is the 20th-largest city of Austria and fifth-largest of Lower Austria. It is approximately 70 kilometres (43 miles) west of Vienna. Krems is a city with its own statute (or Statutarstadt), and therefore it is both a municipality and a district.

== Geography ==
Krems is located at the confluence of the Krems and Danube Rivers at the eastern end of Wachau valley, in the southern Waldviertel.

Krems borders the following municipalities: Stratzing, Langenlois, Rohrendorf bei Krems, Gedersdorf, Traismauer, Nußdorf ob der Traisen, Paudorf, Furth bei Göttweig, Mautern an der Donau, Dürnstein, and Senftenberg.

== History ==
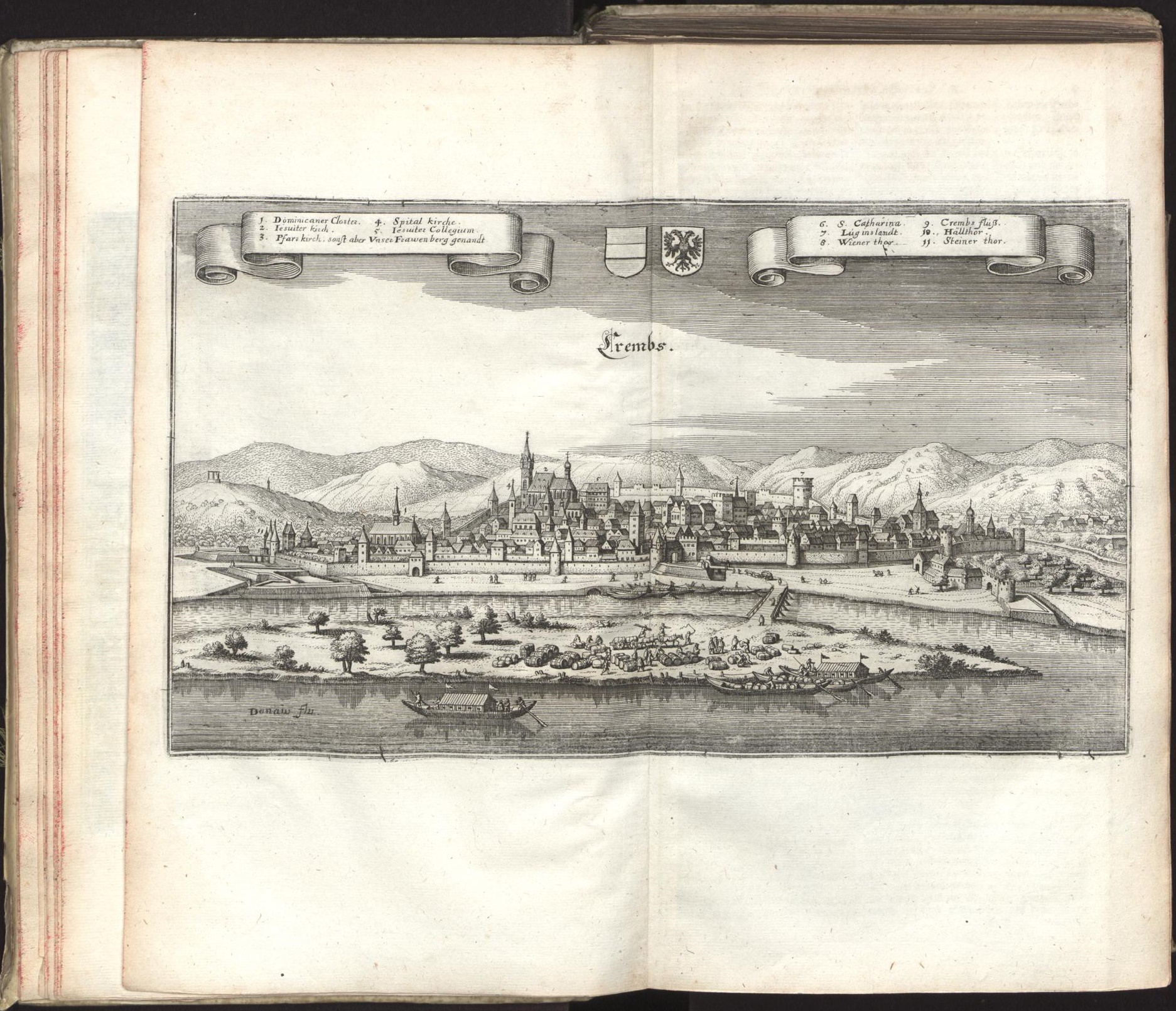
View of Krems in 1679

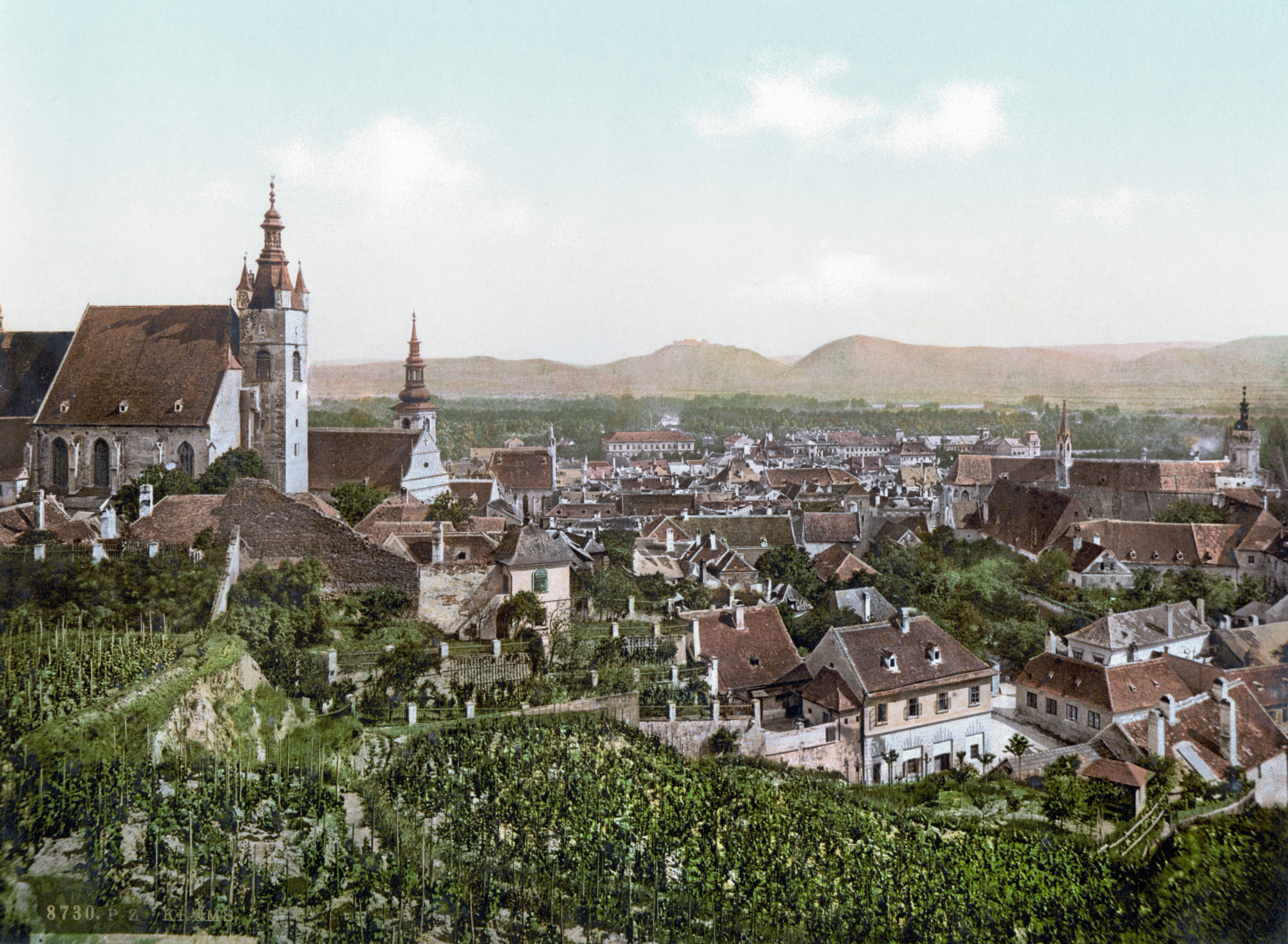
View of Krems in 1900

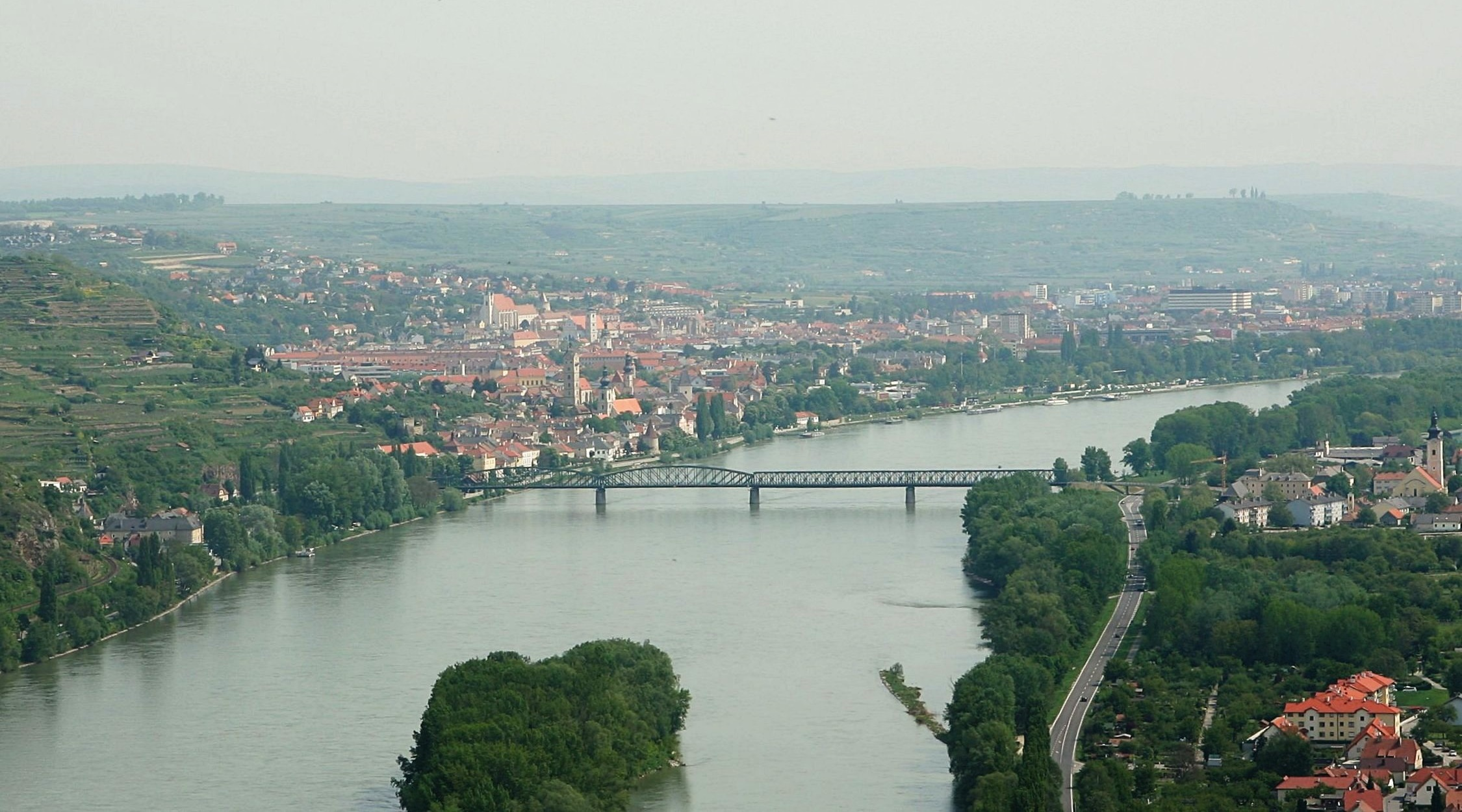
View of Krems in 2006

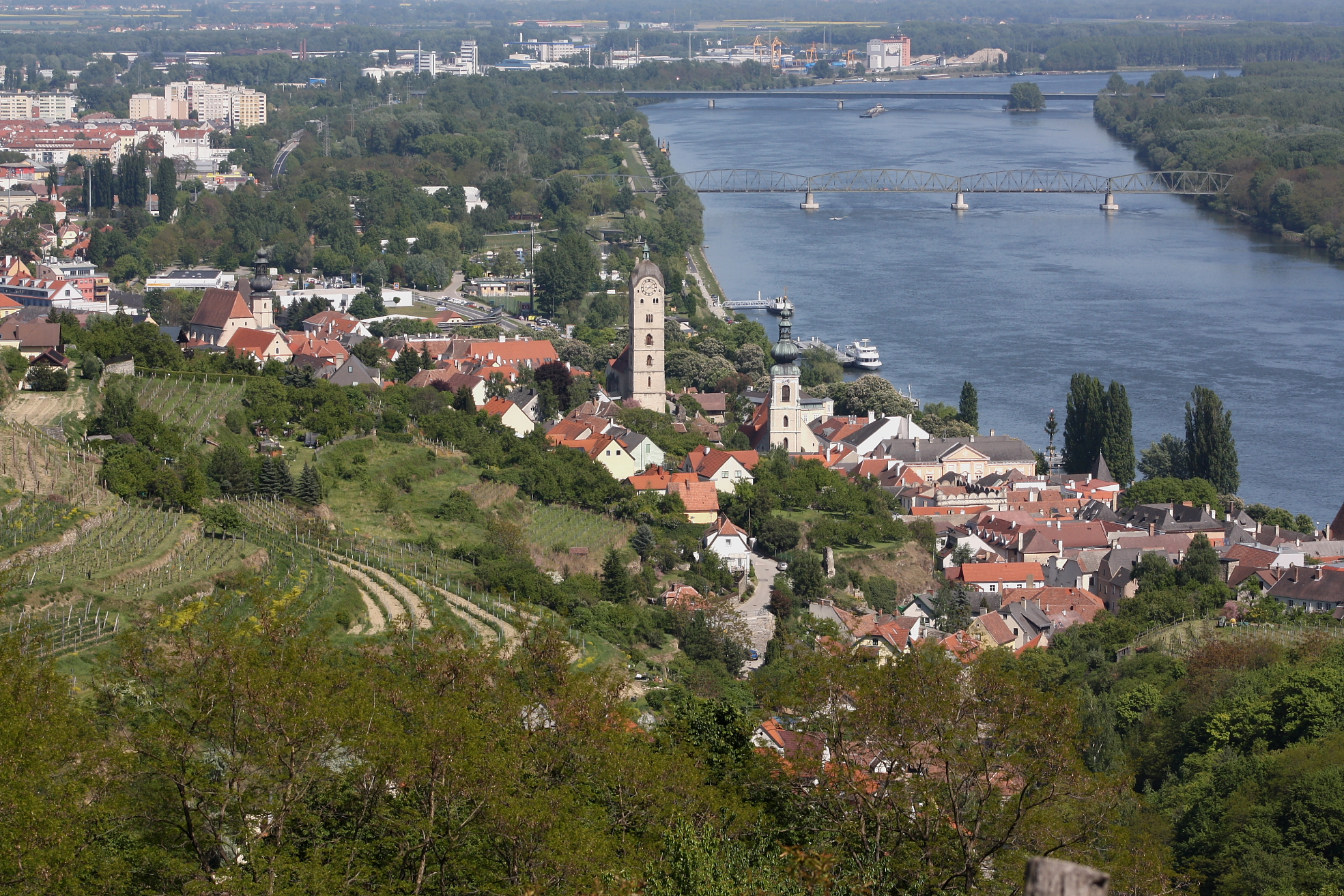
Danube in Krems with the harbour in background

Krems was first mentioned in 995 in a certificate of Otto III, but settlement was apparent even before then. For example, a child's grave, over 27,000 years old, was found here. This is the oldest grave found in Austria.

During the 11th and 12th centuries, Chremis, as it was then called, was almost as large as Vienna.

At the end of the Thirty Years' War, Swedish troops captured Krems in 1645 during their invasion of Lower Austria. The city was recaptured by Imperial troops under Hans Christoph von Puchheim and Johann Wilhelm von Hunolstein on 5 May 1646.

Krems is the primary producer of Marillenschnaps, an apricot brandy. It is also the hometown of Martin Johann Schmidt, called "Kremserschmidt", the leading painter, draughtsman and etcher of the Austrian late Baroque.

=== City division ===
- Innenstadt (Inner City)
- Weinzierl
- Mitterau
- Stein
- Egelsee
- Rehberg
- Am Steindl
- Gneixendorf
- Lerchenfeld
- Krems-Süd (South Krems)

== Population development ==
The population (with principal residence status) in the agglomeration was about 50,000 at the end of 2010.

== Climate ==
Climate data for Krems
Month	Jan	Feb	Mar	Apr	May	Jun	Jul	Aug	Sep	Oct	Nov	Dec	Year
Record high °C (°F)	16.8 (62.2)	21.1 (70.0)	24.9 (76.8)	27.8 (82.0)	31.6 (88.9)	36.8 (98.2)	36.0 (96.8)	36.5 (97.7)	33.5 (92.3)	27.2 (81.0)	23.5 (74.3)	16.1 (61.0)	36.8 (98.2)
Mean daily maximum °C (°F)	3.1 (37.6)	5.1 (41.2)	10.2 (50.4)	15.3 (59.5)	20.6 (69.1)	23.3 (73.9)	25.8 (78.4)	25.5 (77.9)	20.4 (68.7)	14.5 (58.1)	7.5 (45.5)	3.7 (38.7)	14.6 (58.3)
Daily mean °C (°F)	−0.6 (30.9)	0.8 (33.4)	4.9 (40.8)	9.3 (48.7)	14.6 (58.3)	17.6 (63.7)	19.5 (67.1)	18.9 (66.0)	14.3 (57.7)	8.9 (48.0)	3.7 (38.7)	0.7 (33.3)	9.4 (48.9)
Mean daily minimum °C (°F)	−3.2 (26.2)	−2.5 (27.5)	0.8 (33.4)	4.5 (40.1)	9.0 (48.2)	12.0 (53.6)	13.8 (56.8)	13.4 (56.1)	9.7 (49.5)	4.9 (40.8)	0.8 (33.4)	−2.1 (28.2)	5.1 (41.2)
Record low °C (°F)	−22.8 (−9.0)	−20.0 (−4.0)	−18.1 (−0.6)	−4.7 (23.5)	−0.2 (31.6)	1.3 (34.3)	5.7 (42.3)	4.8 (40.6)	0.6 (33.1)	−7.9 (17.8)	−16.3 (2.7)	−22.7 (−8.9)	−22.8 (−9.0)
Average precipitation mm (inches)	17.3 (0.68)	21.0 (0.83)	27.4 (1.08)	37.5 (1.48)	58.2 (2.29)	80.2 (3.16)	79.8 (3.14)	62.0 (2.44)	45.5 (1.79)	28.3 (1.11)	33.6 (1.32)	24.9 (0.98)	515.7 (20.3)
Average snowfall cm (inches)	8.3 (3.3)	7.5 (3.0)	6.2 (2.4)	0.2 (0.1)	0.0 (0.0)	0.0 (0.0)	0.0 (0.0)	0.0 (0.0)	0.0 (0.0)	0.0 (0.0)	4.2 (1.7)	6.8 (2.7)	33.2 (13.1)
Average precipitation days (≥ 1.0 mm)	5.0	5.1	5.8	6.5	9.0	9.9	9.6	8.4	6.9	5.0	7.2	6.0	84.4
Average snowy days (≥ 1.0 cm)	10.1	6.9	2.6	0.2	0.0	0.0	0.0	0.0	0.0	0.0	1.8	6.2	27.8
Mean monthly sunshine hours	55.3	88.8	127.4	171.5	219.6	214.2	238.5	234.9	157.3	120.9	53.9	41.9	1,724.2
Source: Central Institute for Meteorology and Geodynamics

== Main sights ==
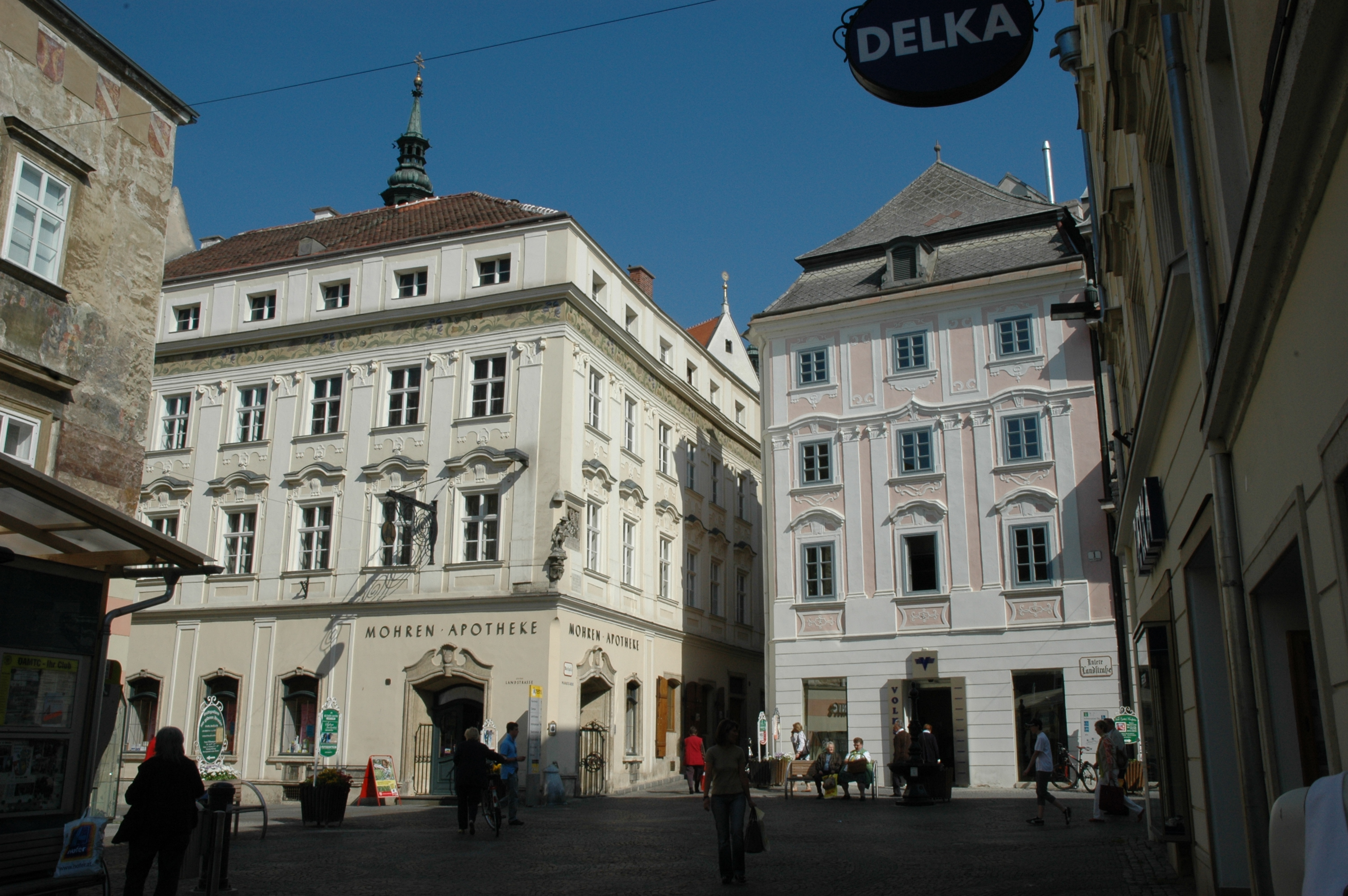
Old Town of Krems

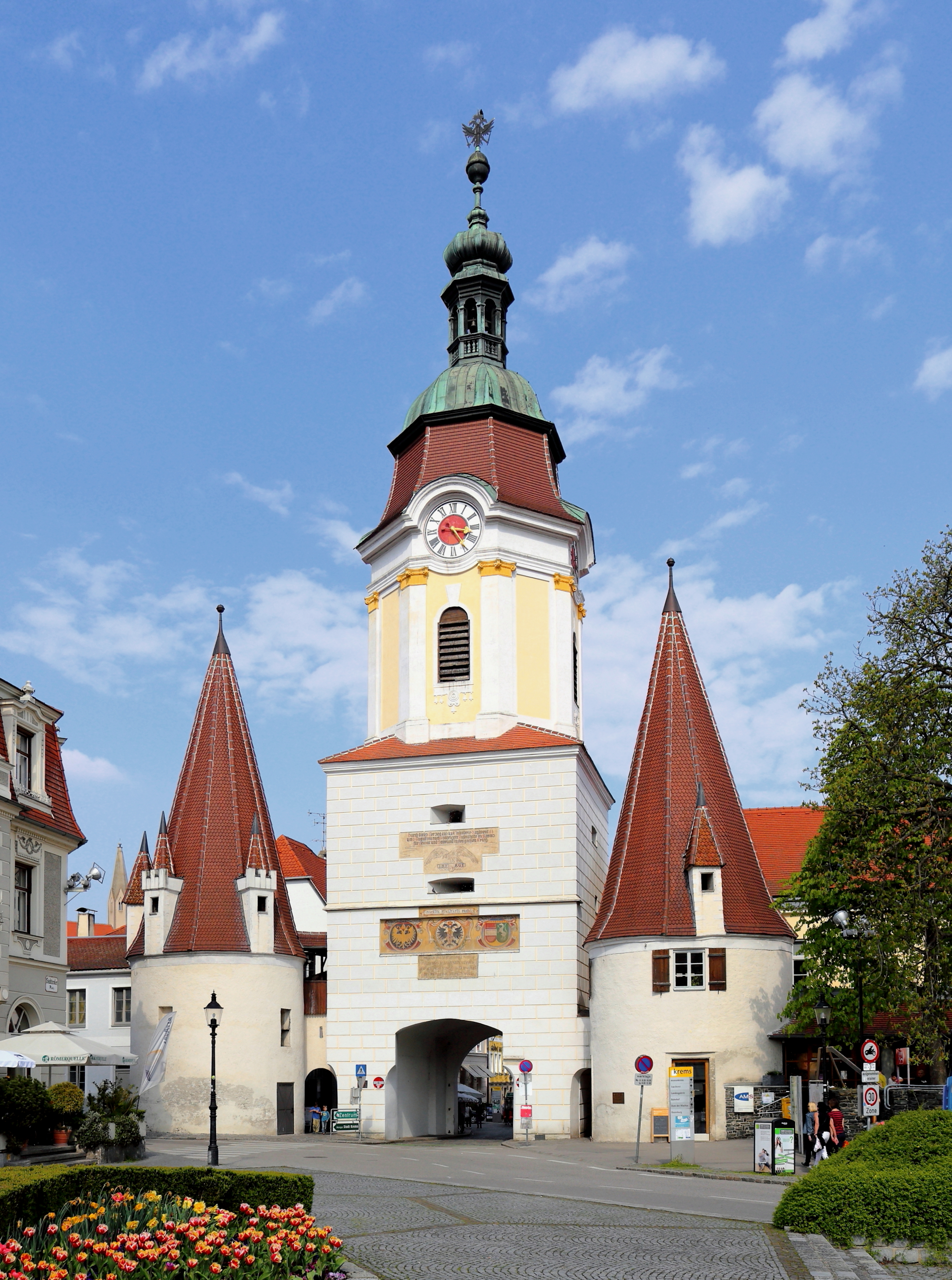
The Steiner Tor in Krems

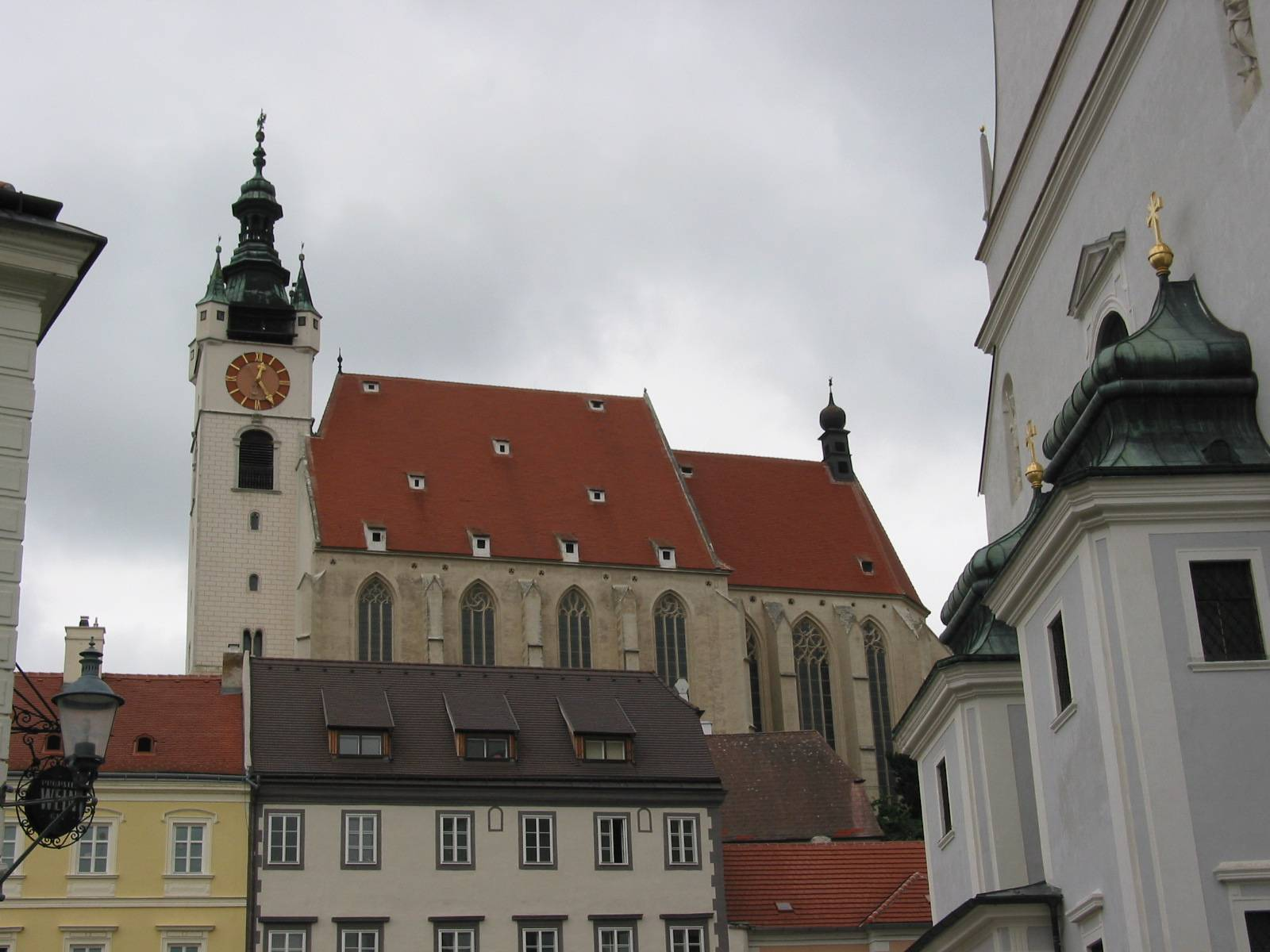
Piarist Church

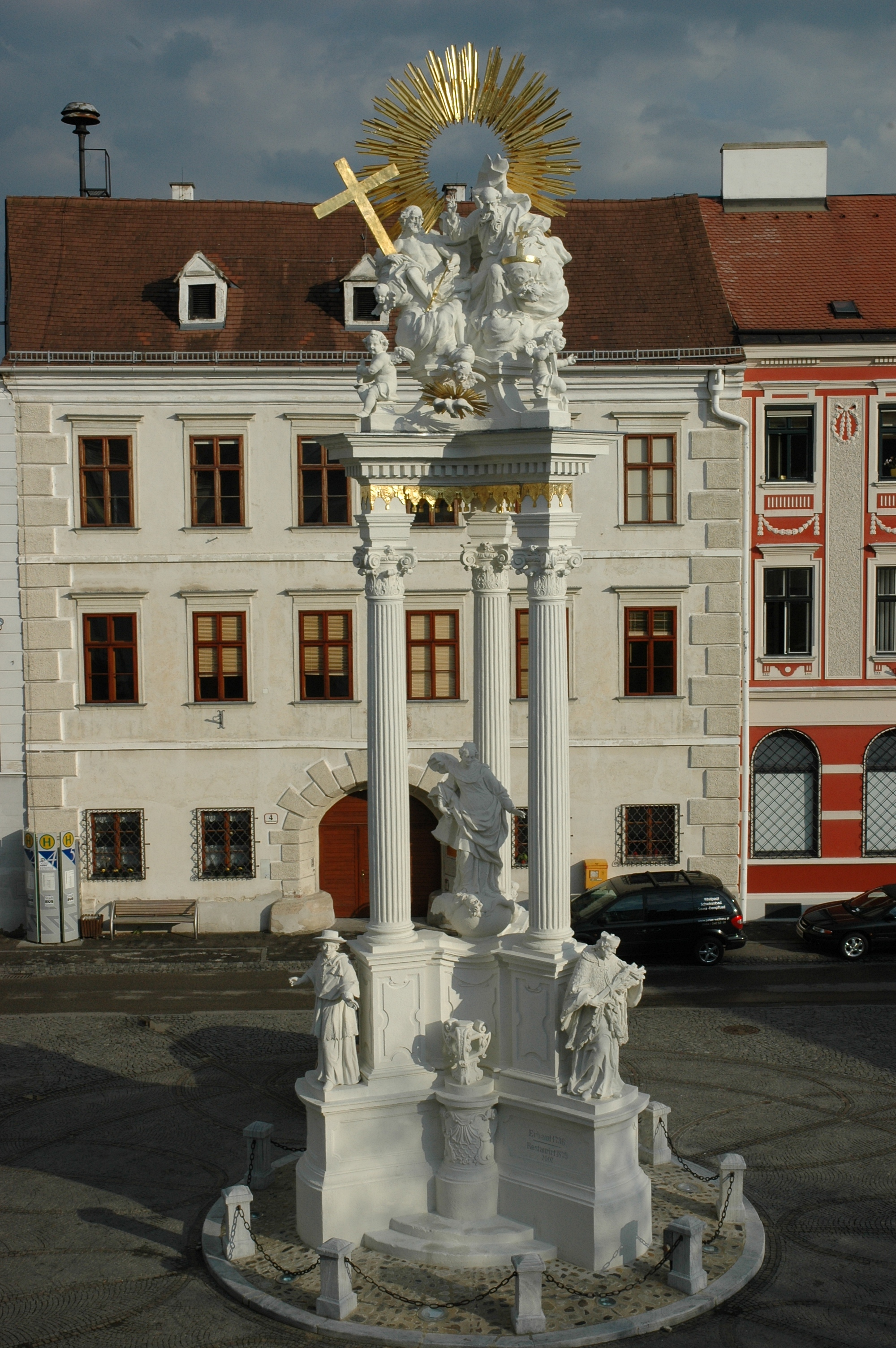
Dreifaltigkeitssäule

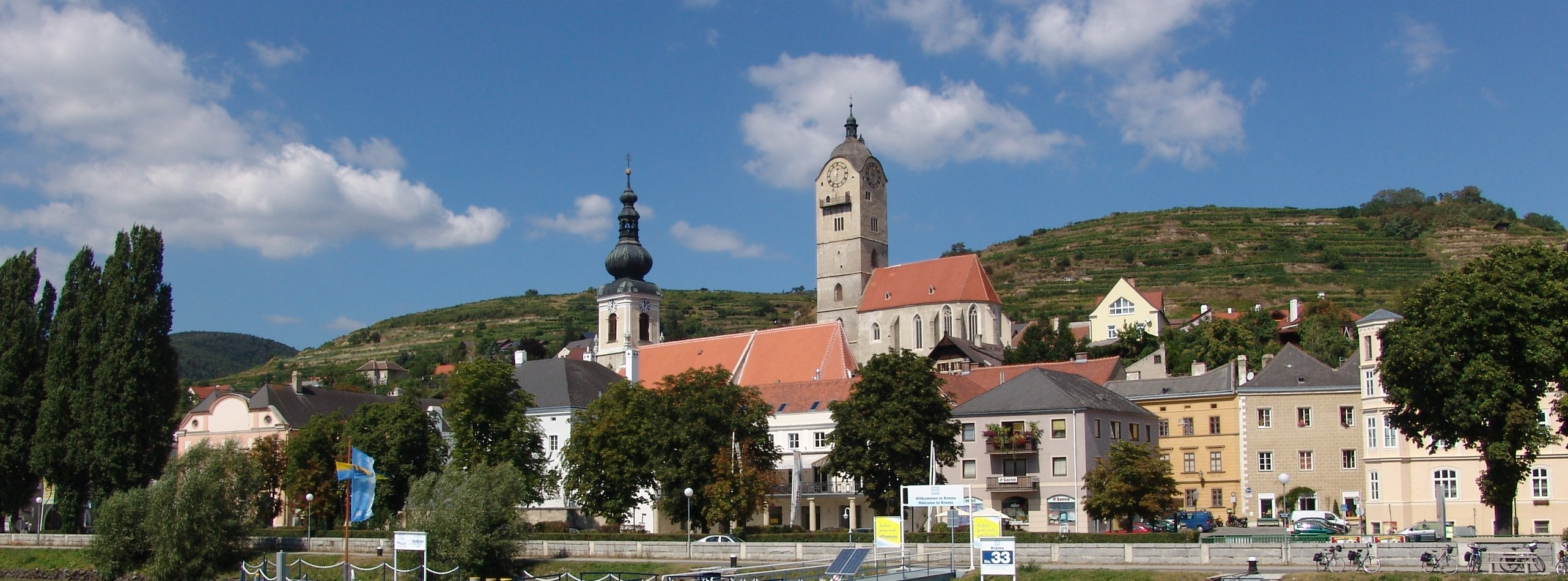
View of Stein an der Donau, a quarter in the west end of the city

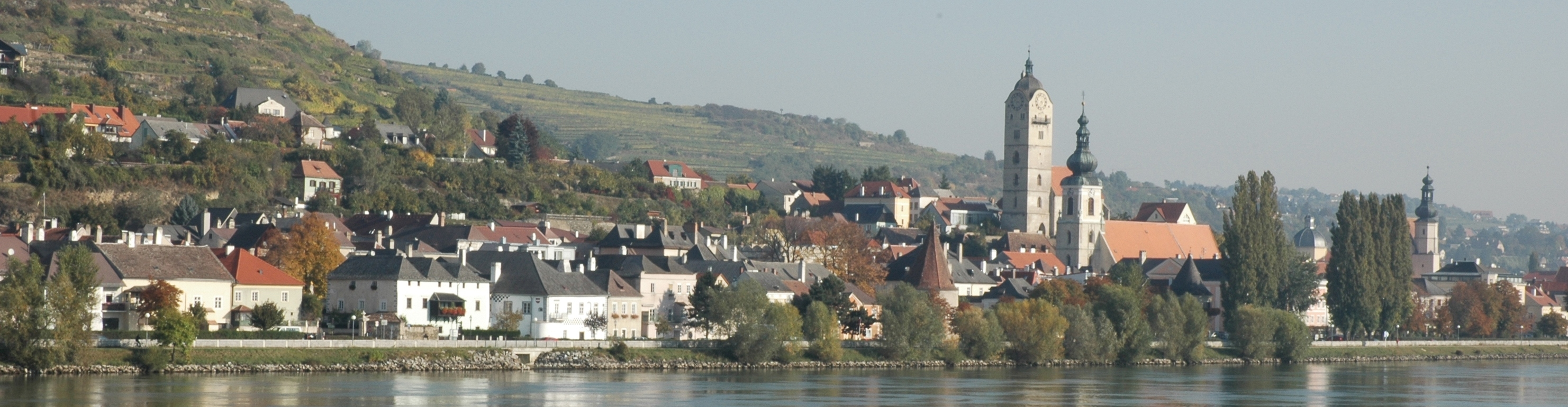
View of Stein (from the left to the right: Frauenbergkirche, Pfarrkirche Hl. Nikolaus, Minoritenkirche)

=== Old town ===
- Bürgerspitalkirche
- Dominikanerkirche
- Dreifaltigkeitssäule
- Göglhaus
- Gozzoburg
- Großes Sgraffitohaus
- Pfarrkirche St. Veit
- Piaristenkirche
- Pulverturm
- Rathaus
- Simandlbrunnen
- Steiner Tor: The gate, erected in 1480, is the second remaining medieval gate

=== Outside the Old Town ===
- Frauenbergkirche
- Göttweigerhofkapelle
- Großer Passauerhof
- Karikaturmuseum Krems
- Kloster Und
- Kremser Tor
- Kunsthalle Krems
- Forum Frohner
- Landesgalerie Niederösterreich
- Linzer Tor
- Mauthaus
- Minoritenkirche
- Pfarrkirche Hl. Nikolaus
- Salzstadl
- University Krems

== Transport ==
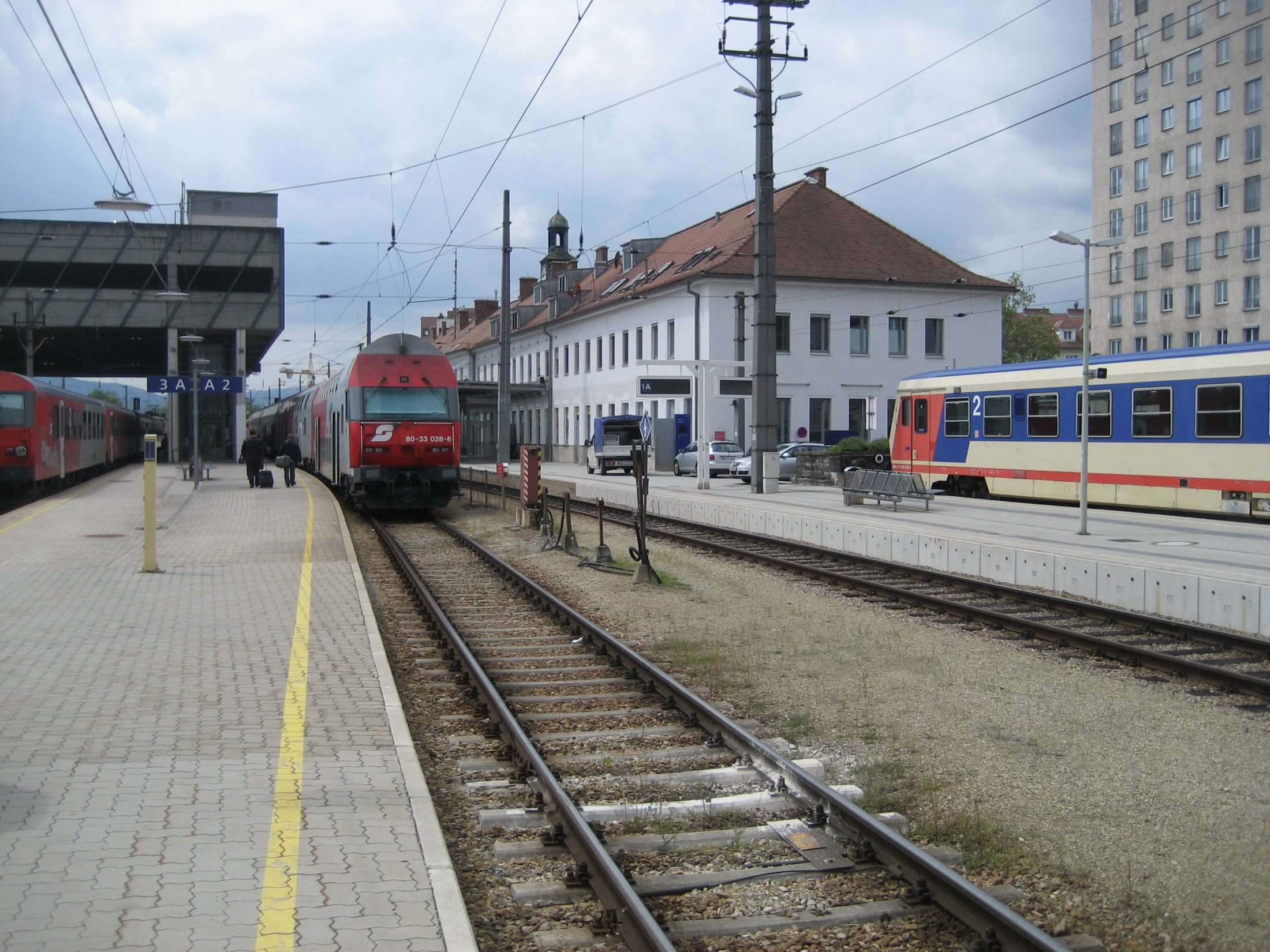
Krems Central Station

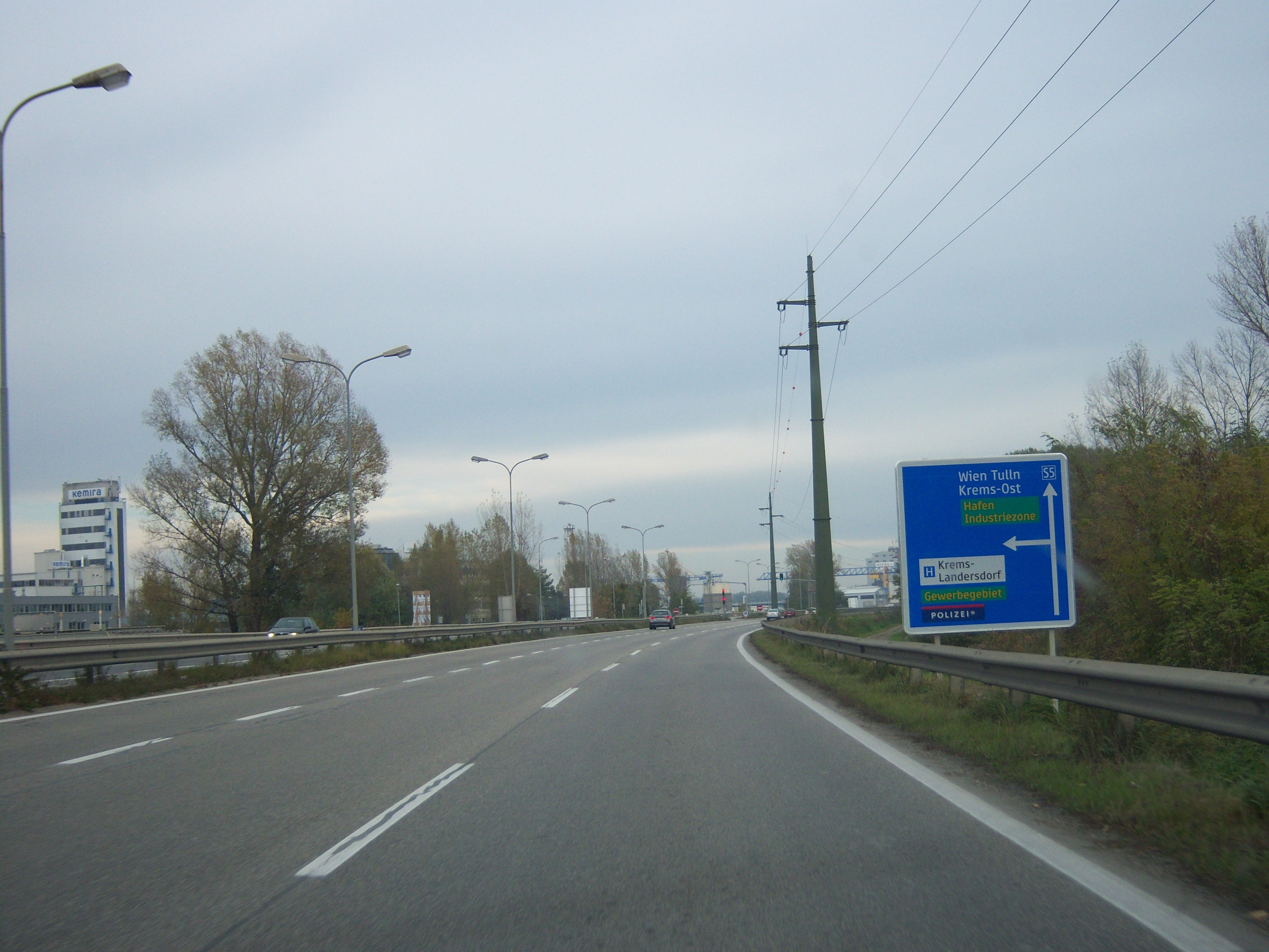
Motorway to Vienna in the industrial area of Krems

The city's main railway station is a junction of the Franz-Josefs Railway to Vienna, the Kremser Railway to St. Pölten, the Donauufer Railway to Spitz and the regional railway to Horn. It is at the intersection of the Stockerauer Speedway S5 and the Kremser Speedway S33, and is traversed by the Danube Road B3, the Retzer Road B35, the Kremser Road B37 and the Langenloiser Road B218. Krems is a junction of the Wieselbus bus lines, which provides radial connections between Sankt Pölten and the different regions of Lower Austria.

Main Roads

- Stockerauer Schnellstraße (S5) from Krems to Vienna
- Kremser Schnellstraße (S33) from Krems to St. Pölten
- Donau Straße (B3) from Krems to Linz
- Aggsteiner Straße (B33) from Krems to Melk
  - Aggsteiner Straße (B33a) from Krems to Mautern an der Donau
- Retzer Straße (B35) from Krems to Retz
- Kremser Straße (B37) from Krems to Rastenfeld
  - Kremser Straße (B37a) from Krems to Traismauer
- Langenloiser Straße (B218) from Krems to Langenlois

Railroad

- Franz-Josefs-Bahn from Krems to Vienna
- Kremser Bahn from Krems to St. Pölten
- Donauuferbahn from Krems to Spitz
- Kamptalbahn from Krems to Sigmundsherberg

Air traffic

- Gneixendorf airfield is a small general aviation airport.

The nearest passenger airport to the city is Vienna Airport, located 80 km (50 mi) south east of Krems an der Donau.

=== In the city ===
A network of four bus lines operates at regular intervals within the city. Every summer, a tourist train connects the ancient parts of the city with museums, the central railway station and the passenger ship terminal of Krems.

== Politics ==
=== Municipal council ===
The municipal council consists of 40 members and since the municipal elections in 2017 it consists of the following parties:

- 19 Social Democratic Party of Austria (SPÖ) – the mayor and the first vice mayor
- 8 Austrian People's Party (ÖVP) – the second vice mayor
- 5 Freedom Party of Austria (FPÖ)
- 2 KLS
- 1 Austrian Green Party
- 1 PROKS

Municipal elections in Krems were held, at the same time as the Austrian legislative election, 2022 in 2022.

=== City's senate ===
The city's senate consists of 10 members:

- SPÖ: 5 members
- ÖVP: 3 members
- FPÖ: 2 members

== Public facilities ==
=== Educational facilities ===
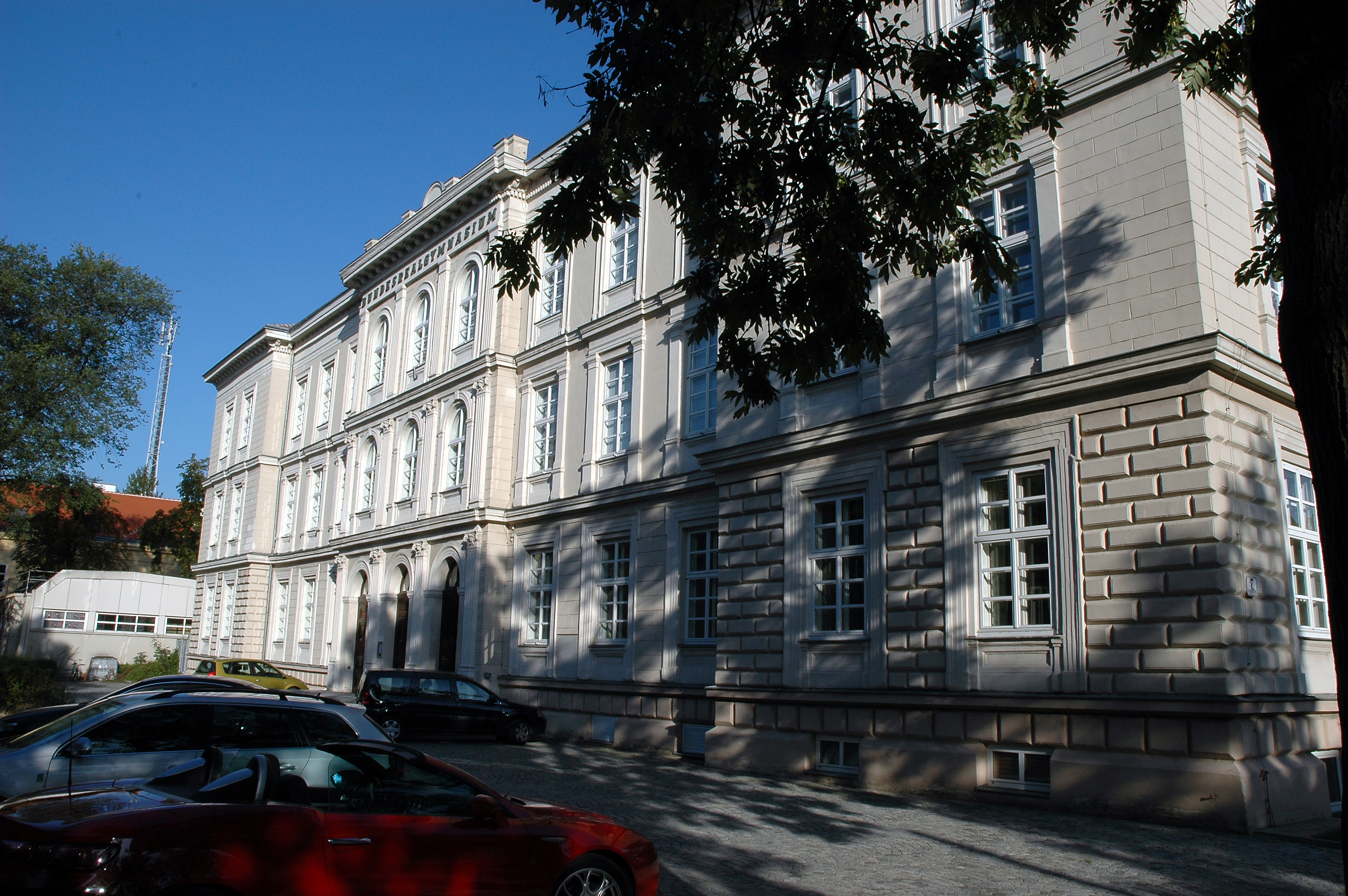
Bundesrealgymnasium Krems Ringstraße

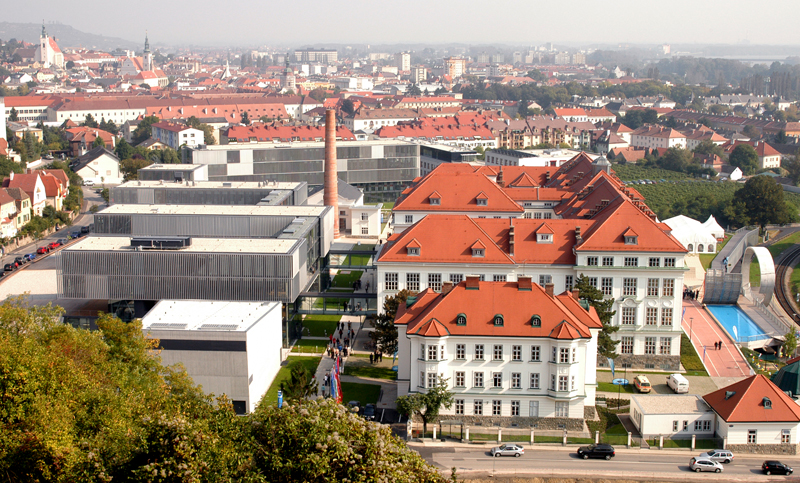
University for Continuing Education Krems

- BHAK/BHAS Krems
- Bundesgymnasium Piaristen
- Bundesgymnasium Rechte Kremszeile
- Bundesreal- and Bundesoberstufenrealgymnasium (BORG) Krems Heinemannstraße
- Bundesrealgymnasium Krems Ringstraße
- Danube Private University
- University for Continuing Education Krems
- Adult education centre
- HLA/HLW Krems
- HLF Krems
- HTBL Krems
- IMC Fachhochschule Krems (University of Applied Sciences)
- Karl Landsteiner Privatuniversität für Gesundheitswissenschaften
- Oberstufenrealgymnasium Englische Fräulein
- School of education

=== Prison ===
- Justizanstalt Stein is a prison housing some of Austria's worst offenders.

=== Leisure and sports sites ===
Swimming is available at Kremser Strandbad (indoor swimming pool) and outdoor.

- Football – Kremser SC
- Ice hockey – KEV Eagles
- Miniature golf
- Rugby Club Krems
- Skatepark
- Team handball – Union Handballklub Krems
- Union Badminton Krems

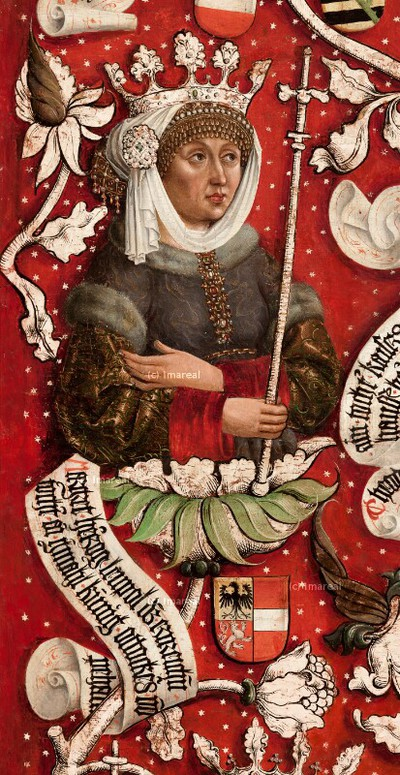
Margaret of Austria, ca.1490

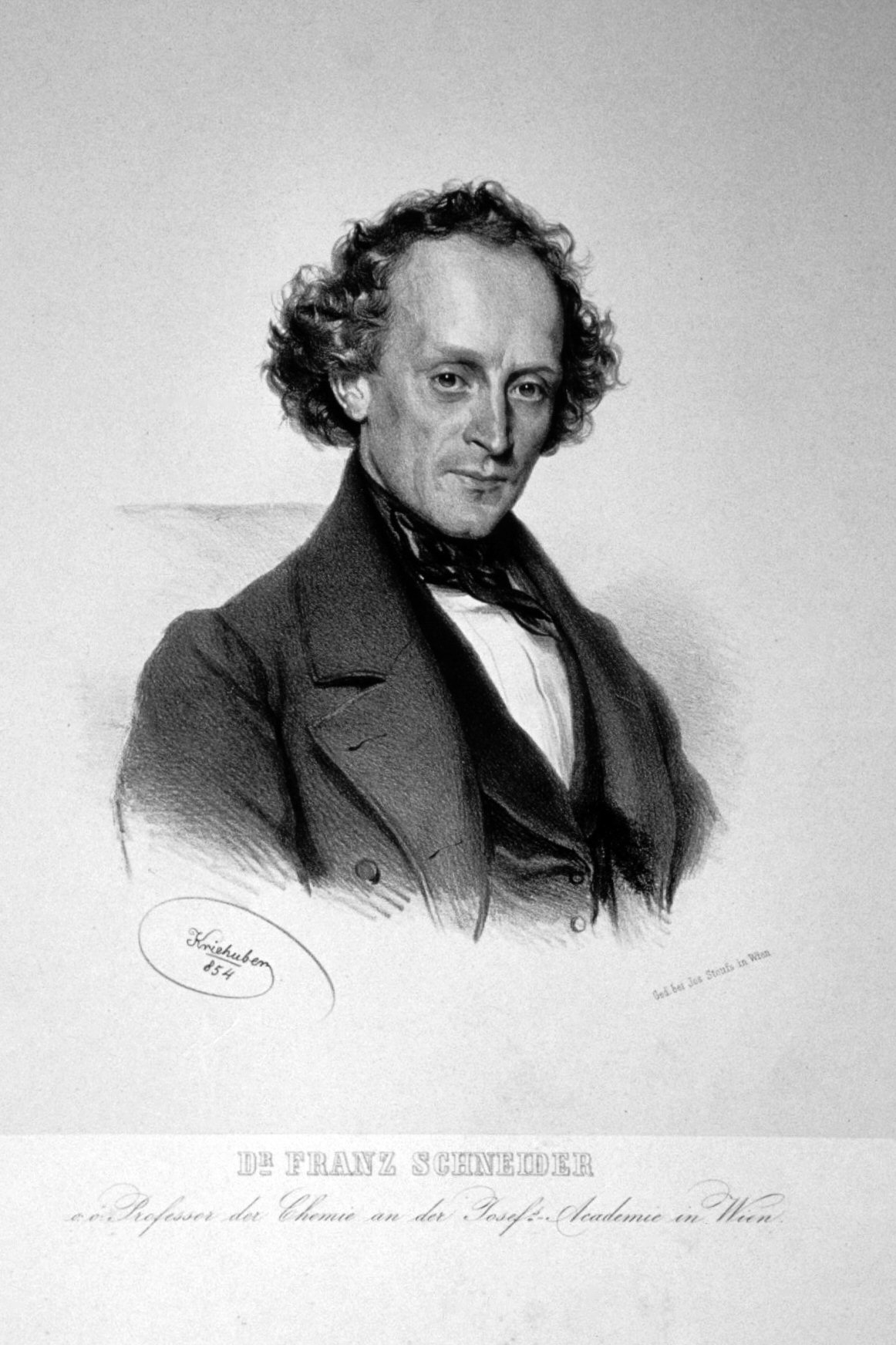
Franz Schneider, 1854

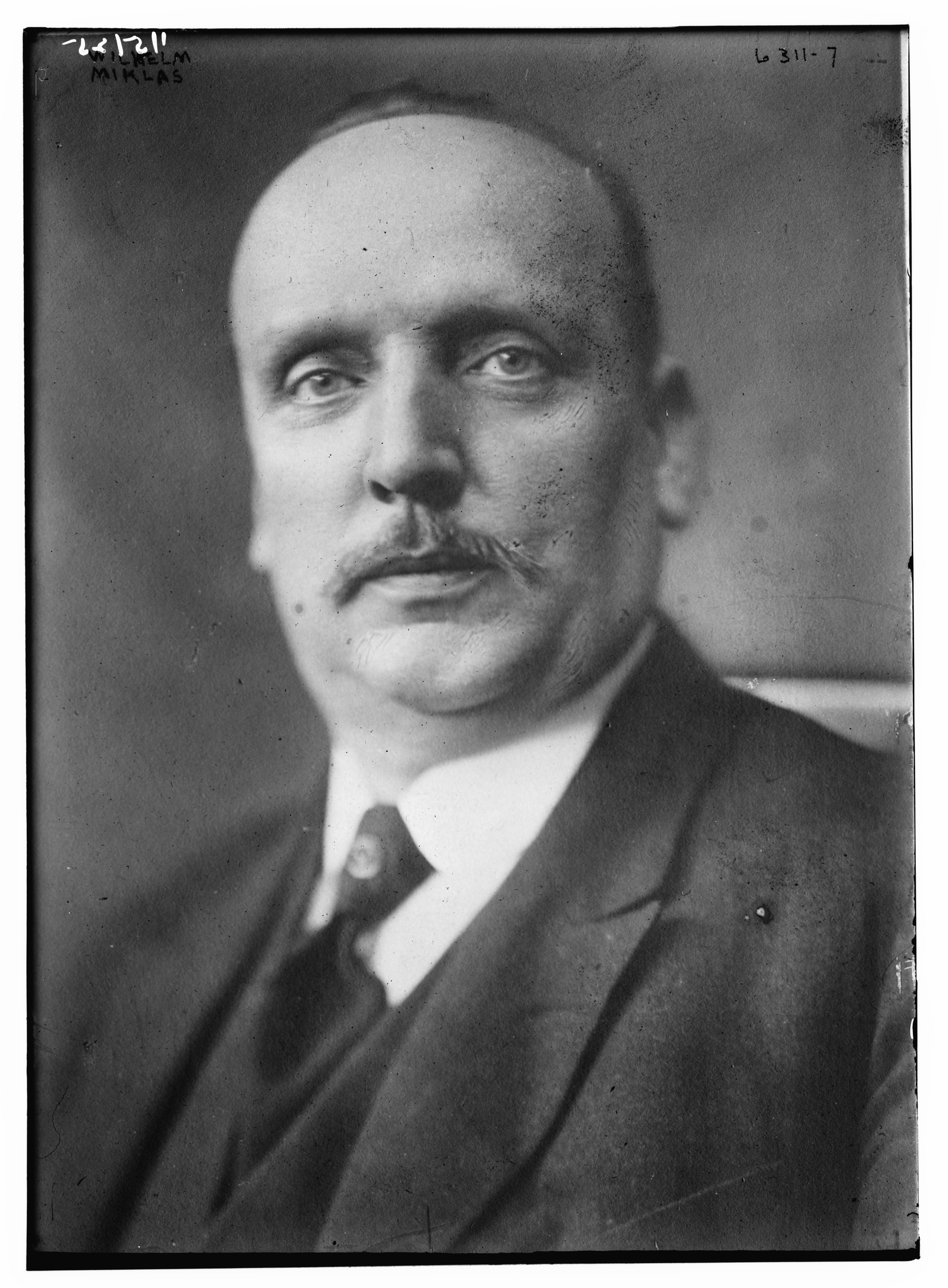
Wilhelm Miklas, 3rd President of Austria

== Notable people ==
- Ava (ca.1060–1127), poet, the first named female writer in the German language; she lived in Krems
- Margaret of Austria (1204–1266), German queen, (1225-1235) & Queen of Bohemia, (1253-1260).
- Johann Georg Schmidt (1685–1748), called the "Wiener Schmidt", an Austrian Baroque painter, he died in Krems
- Martin Johann Schmidt (1718–1801), called the "Kremser Schmidt", painter of the Austrian Rococo, he died in Krems
- Michael Wutky (1739–1822), an Austrian landscape painter in the Rococo style
- Ludwig Guttenbrunn (1750–1819), an Austrian artist of portraits and history painting.
- Vinzenz Eduard Milde (1777–1853), Dean of Krems and Archbishop of Vienna, pastor of Krems and teacher at the former Piarist Gymnasium Krems, (DE Wiki).
- Ludwig Ritter von Köchel (1800–1877), an Austrian musicologist, writer, composer, botanist and publisher.
- Franz Schneider (1812–1897), physician and chemist
- Eduard Melly, (DE Wiki) (1814-1854), art historian, politician and numismatist
- Johann Nordmann (1820–1887), journalist, travel writer and poet
- Wilhelm Gause (1853–1916), painter, he died in Krems
- Josef Maria Eder (1855–1944), photochemist and pioneer of Picture & Photography
- Julius Ernest Wilhelm Fučík (1872–1916) composer and conductor; military musician in Krems, 1891-1894
- Wilhelm Miklas (1872–1956), politician (CS) and the third President of the 1st Republic, 1928-1938
- Josef Meller, (DE Wiki) (1874–1968), university professor of ophthalmology
- Josef Bayer, (DE Wiki) (1882–1931), director of Natural History Museum, Vienna, helped find Venus of Willendorf
- Fritz Dworschak (1890–1974), an Austrian numismatist, art historian and museum director
- Rudolf Redlinghofer (1900–1940), Conscientious objector, Nazi victim, beheaded in 1940, now rehabilitated
- Peter B. Neubauer (1913–2008), child psychiatrist and psychoanalyst
- Wolfgang Kummer, (DE Wiki) (1935–2007), physicist
- Dagmar Braun Celeste (born 1941), an American counselor, author and former first lady of Ohio
- Ulrike Lunacek (born 1957), journalist and politician (Green)
- Robert Streibel (born 1959), historian, writer and poet.

=== Sport ===
- Gregor Hradetzky (1909–1984), organ builder and canoeist, two gold medals at the 1936 Summer Olympics
- Marko Stankovic (born 1986), football player, played 371 games
- Lukas Thürauer (born 1987), Austrian footballer who has played over 340 games

== Twin towns ==
Krems is twinned with the following cities:

- Ribe, Denmark, since 1971
- Böblingen, Baden-Württemberg, Germany, since 1971
- Beaune, Côte-d'Or, Bourgogne-Franche-Comté, France, since 1973
- Passau, Bavaria, Germany, since 1974
- Kroměříž, Czech Republic, since 1994
- Grapevine, Texas, United States, since 1999

== See also ==
- Donaufestival - annual festival of music and performance held in Krems
