= Robert Streibel =

Austrian historian, writer and poet

Robert Streibel (born 27 January 1959) is an Austrian historian, writer and poet.

== Life ==
Born in Krems an der Donau, Streibel studied history, German studies, theatre studies and history of art in Vienna and received his doctorate under Erika Weinzierl at the Department of Contemporary History of the University of Vienna. Professionally, he has been working in the field of adult education at the "Verband Wiener Volksbildung" (Association of Viennese Public Education) for public relations since 1987. From 1999 to 2024, he was also the director of a Folk high school in Vienna-Hietzing.

There are numerous publications by him from historical research projects on National Socialism, Judaism and exile, with a focus on Lower Austria and his birthplace Krems an der Donau.

He also published in literary magazines, a book of poetry and films. He is a freelancer for the weekly newspaper Die Furche (literary criticism) and the daily newspaper Die Presse.

== Work ==
History

- Plötzlich waren sie alle weg. Die Juden der „Gauhauptstadt Krems“ und ihre Mitbürger. Picus, Vienna 1991, ISBN 3-85452-223-1.
- Das fünfte Pseudonym. Das Leben des Lagerhäftlings und Humoristen Boris Brainin. In Hans Schafranek (ed.): Die Betrogenen. Österreicher als Opfer stalinistischen Terrors in der Sowjetunion. Picus, Vienna 1991, ISBN 3-85452-219-3.
- Die Stadt Krems im Dritten Reich. Alltagschronik 1938–1945. Picus, Vienna 1993, ISBN 3-85452-248-7
- Februar in der Provinz. Eine Spurensicherung zum 12. Februar 1934 in Niederösterreich. Edition Geschichte der Heimat, Grünbach 1994, ISBN 3-900943-20-6.
- with Hans Schafranek (ed.): Strategie des Überlebens. Häftlingsgesellschaften in KZ und GULag. Picus-Verlag, Vienna 1996, ISBN 3-85452-401-3.
- with Gerhard Bisovsky, Hans Schafranek: Der Molotov–Ribbentrop Pact. Voraussetzungen, Hintergründe, Auswirkungen. Vienna 1990.
- Kündigungsgrund Nichtarier. ISBN 3-902167-04-1
- Eugenie Schwarzwald und ihr Kreis. Picus, Vienna 1996, ISBN 3-85452-294-0.
- Krems 1938–1945. Eine Geschichte von Anpassung, Verrat und Widerstand. Verlag Bibliothek der Provinz, Weitra 2014, ISBN 978-3-99028-330-1.
- Bürokratie & Beletage. Ein Ringstraßenpalais zwischen Arisierung und spätem Recht. Palais Schwab, Mandelbaum Verlag, Vienna 2015, ISBN 978385476-464-9.

Novels

- April in Stein, Roman, Residenz Verlag, Salzburg/Wien 2015, ISBN 978-3-7017-1649-4
- Der Wein des Vergessens, Roman, gemeinsam mit Bernhard Herrmann, Residenz Verlag, Salzburg/Vienna 2018, ISBN 978-3-7017-1696-8

Poetry

- Sieben Schritte in den Raum. Gedichte. Edition Selene, Wien 2003, ISBN 3-85266-204-4.
- Weltgericht auf Besuch. Gedichte der letzten sieben Jahre. Resistenz Verlag, 2011, ISBN 978-3-85285-206-5.

Publisher

- with Kurt Schmid: Der Pogrom 1938 – Judenverfolgung in Österreich und Deutschland. Aufsatzsammlung der VHS Brigittenau 1988, Picus, Wien 1990, ISBN 3-85452-213-4.
- Hans-Czermak-Preis: Lesebuch – Artikel, Literatur und Projekte für eine gewaltfreie Erziehung. Edition Volkshochschule, Vienna 1998.
- with Angelica Bäumer, Reinhold Egerth, Christine Pirker: Seinerzeit ausgewandert nach Palästina. Kunstkatalog 1999.
- with Markus Vorzellner: Adorno hören – Von der Sprache des Denkens. Edition Volkshochschule, Vienna 2005, ISBN 3-900799-68-7.

Filmography

- Starker Tobak – Kurzfilm der VHS Hietzing zum 60. Geburtstag, (Regie), with Barbara Rett, Wilhelm Filla, Manfred Schindler, Vienna 2007. Online youtube.com 9:45min
- Lesung aus dem Buch der Offenbarungen 1. Kurzfilm der VHS Hietzing: Das Kursprogramm nach der Pisa-Studie, Vienna 2007. Online youtube.com 7:14min
- Three wise men. Kurzfilm der EU Lernpartnerschaft NEFOMA im Rahmen von Grundtvig 2, (Regie), mit Karin Beckham, Maureen Buchanan, Siegfried Sorz among others, Vienna 2007 Online youtube.com 2:20

== Awards ==
- 1997: Willy und Helga Verkauf-Verlon Preis of the DÖW
- 2008: Preis der Stadt Wien für Volksbildung
- 2015: Leon-Zelman-Preis
