= Heinrich Gotthold Arnold =

German painter

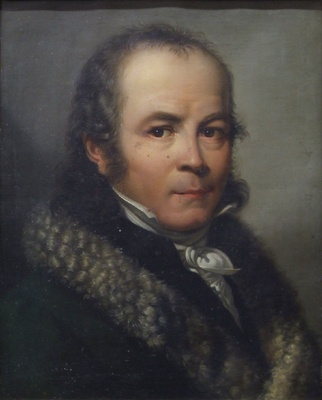
Heinrich Gotthold Arnold (ca. 1830)

Heinrich Gotthold Arnold (4 March 1785 – 3 May 1854) was a German painter.

== Life ==
Arnold was born in 1785 at Lomnitz, near Radeberg in Saxony. He was a pupil of Johann David Schubert at the Dresden Art Academy, and studied the works of Titian, Guido Reni, and other great masters in the Dresden Gallery. He painted figural scenes with little girls, older women, soldiers, portraits and sacred subjects for churches in Saxony and Poland. He became a professor at the Dresden Academy of Fine Arts himself and died in Dresden in 1854.

His self portrait is in the collection of the Dresden Art Gallery of New Masters.

== See also ==
- List of German painters

== Sources ==
- Friedrich von Boetticher (ed.): Malerwerke des neunzehnten jahrhunderts. Beitrag zur Kunstgeschichte. Part 1, vol. 1, 1891.
- Wilhelm Schmidt: Arnold, Heinrich Gotthold. In: Allgemeine Deutsche Biographie (ADB). vol. 1, Duncker & Humblot, Leipzig 1875, p. 588.
- Hans Vollmer: Arnold, Heinrich Gotthold. In: Ulrich Thieme, Felix Becker (Hrsg.): Allgemeines Lexikon der Bildenden Künstler von der Antike bis zur Gegenwart. Begründet von Ulrich Thieme und Felix Becker. vol. 2: Antonio da Monza–Bassan. Wilhelm Engelmann, Leipzig 1908, p. 130–131 (Textarchiv – Internet Archive).
