= Robert von Schneider =

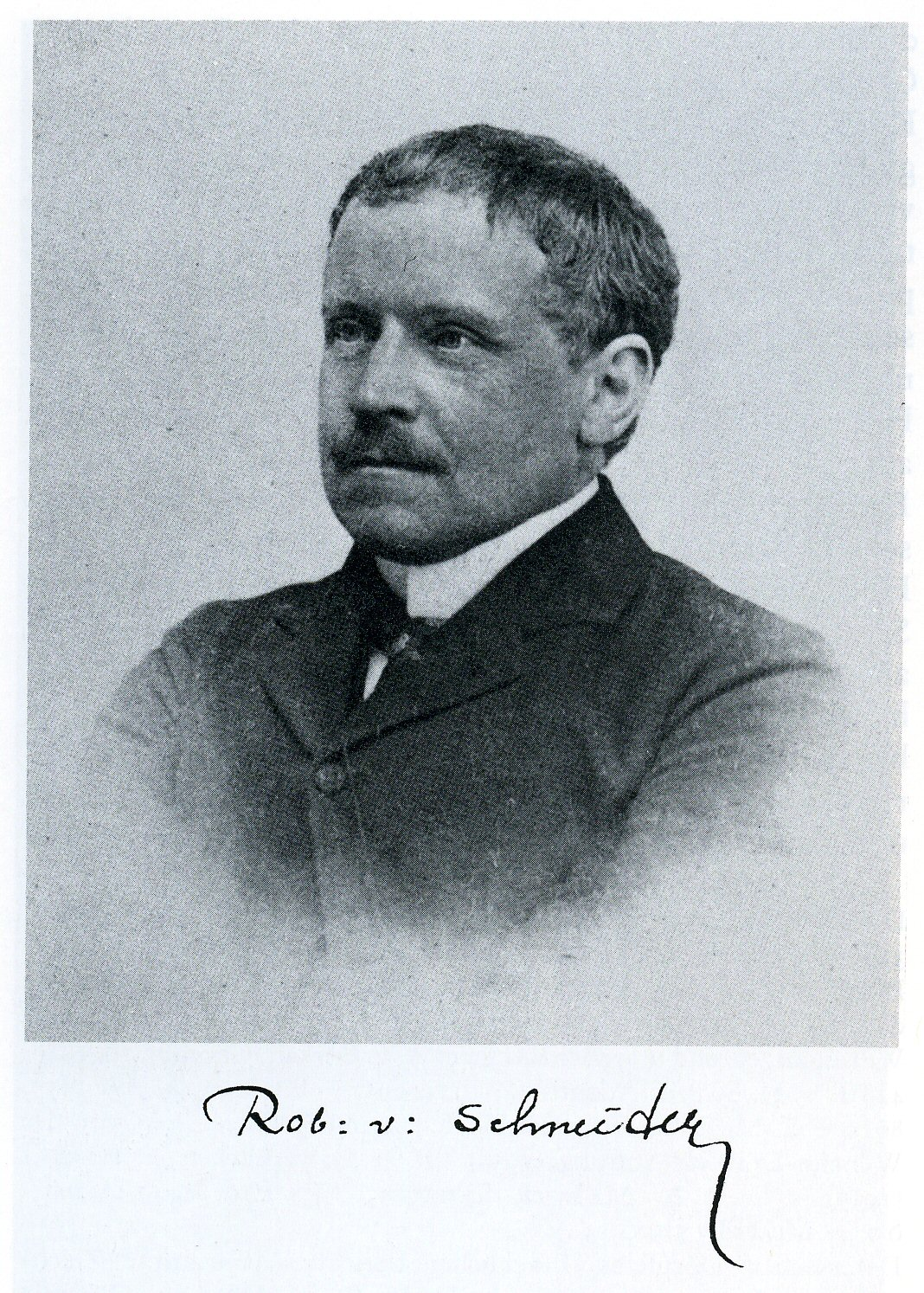
Robert von Schneider

Robert von Schneider (17 November 1854, Vienna – 24 October 1909, Vienna) was an Austrian classical archaeologist. He was the son of chemist Franz Schneider.

He studied archaeology at the University of Vienna as a student of Alexander Conze, and in 1880, received his doctorate at Vienna with Otto Benndorf as his academic sponsor. In 1894 he obtained his habilitation for classical archaeology at the university, where in 1898 he became a full professor.

In 1900 he was named director of the antiquities collection at the Kunsthistorisches Museum. In 1907 he succeeded Benndorf as director of the Österreichisches Archäologisches Institut (Austrian Archaeological Institute).

== Published works ==
- Die Geburt der Athena, 1880 – The birth of Athena.
- Die Erzstatue vom Helenenberge : Festschrift zur Begrüssung der XLII. Versammlung deutschen Philologen und Schulmänner zu Wien, 1893 – The bronze statue of Helenenberg.
- Album auserlesener gegenstände der Antiken-Sammlung der alterhöchsten kaiserhauses, 1895 – Album of exquisite objects in the antiquities collection.
- Ausstellung von Fundstücken aus Ephesos im griechischen Tempel im Volksgarten : kunsthistorische Sammlungen des Allerhöchsten Kaiserhauses, 1902 – Exhibition of finds from Ephesus at the Volksgarten.

He also contributed to Die attischen Grabreliefs project (Attican funerary reliefs, 1893-1922); its other authors being Alexander Conze, Adolf Michaelis, Achilleus Postolakas, Emanuel Löwy, Alfred Brueckner and Paul Wolters.
