= Hula (disambiguation) =

Hula is a Polynesian dance.

Hula may also refer to:

- Hula hoop, a toy hoop that is twirled around the waist, limbs or neck

== Places ==
- Hula (woreda), a district in the SNNPR region of Ethiopia
- Houla, Lebanon, a village originally called Hule
  - Hula massacre, during the 1948 Palestine War
- Hula language, an Oceanic language spoken in the Rigo District of Papua-New Guinea
- Houla, a region in Syria
  - Houla massacre, on May 25, 2012
- Hula Valley, Israel, previously Lake Hula

== People ==
- Ed Hula (born 1951), American journalist and producer
- Eduard Hula (1862–1902), Austrian classical archaeologist and epigrapher
- HULA (Sean Yoro, born 1989), American artist
- Stefan Hula (disambiguation), several people
- Lamar "Hula" Mahone, music producer and songwriter, member of The Outhere Brothers

== Other uses ==
- Hula (film), a 1927 silent film directed by Victor Fleming
- Hula (software), an open-source mail and calendar software project by Novell
- Project Hula, a secret program to transfer ships from the United States Navy to the Soviet Navy during World War II
- Walrus HULA, a heavy-lift hybrid airship proposed by DARPA
- Hula, an embroidered cap worn by the Hausa people

== See also ==
- Hulu, an American entertainment company and streaming service
- Hula Hoop (disambiguation)
