= George Niemann =

George Niemann (12 July 1841, Hannover – 19 February 1912, Vienna) was a German-Austrian architect and archaeologist.

From 1860 to 1864 he studied at the Polytechnic Institute in Hannover, then relocated to Vienna, where he worked as an assistant to architect Theophil Hansen. In 1872 he was named professor of architectural theory of design and perspective at the Academy of Fine Arts Vienna.

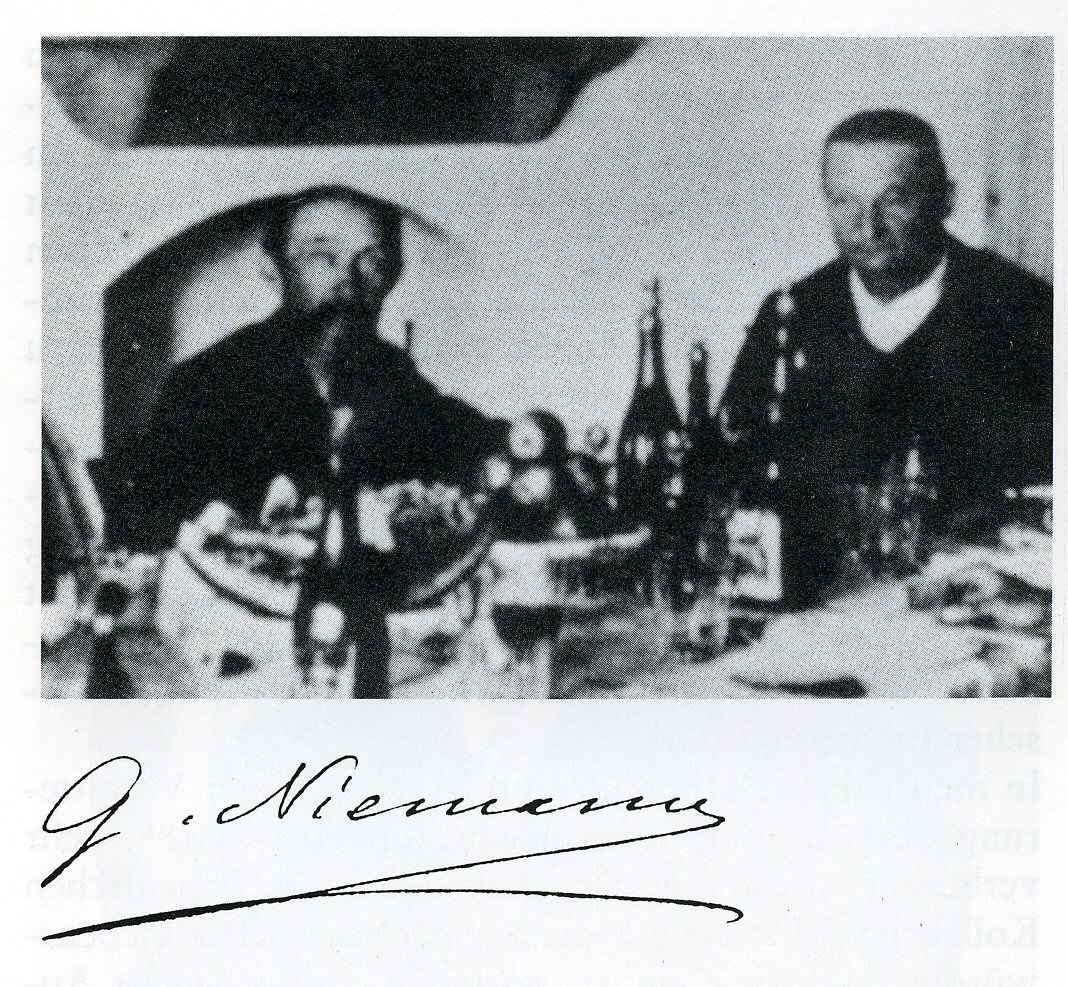
Niemann (left) with Otto Benndorf at Ephesus (1896)

With Alexander Conze and Otto Benndorf, he conducted archaeological research at Samothrace (1873, 1875), and in 1881/82 with Benndorf, he worked at excavation sites in Lycia and Caria (Asia Minor). In 1884/85 he participated in Karol Lanckoroński's archaeological expedition to Asia Minor, and from 1896 to 1902 he took part in the excavations at Ephesus.

Renowned as an architectural artist, he was the creator of highly regarded reconstruction drawings of numerous archaeological structures, such as; the Parthenon and Erechtheion in Athens and the Heroon of Trysa. He also produced a reconstructive drawing of the Temple of Apollo at Didyma for Theodor Wiegand and drew the Palace of Diocletian for Wilhelm von Hartel. Just prior to his death he produced a reconstruction of the Nereid Monument from Xanthos.

== Selected works ==
- Archäologische Untersuchungen auf Samothrake (1875) – Archaeological investigations at Samothrace.
- Reisen im südwestlichten Kleinasien (1884), with Otto Benndorf – Journey to southwestern Asia Minor.
- Handbuch der Linear-Perspektive für bildende Künstler (1884) – Handbook of linear perspective for visual artists.
- Das Heroon von Gjölbaschi-Trysa (1889), with Otto Benndorf – The Heroon of Trysa.
- Städte Pamphyliens und Pisidiens (1890), with Eugen Petersen and Karol Lanckoroński – Cities of Pamphylia und Pisidia.
- Theophilos Hansen und seine Werke (1893), with Ferdinand Fellner von Feldegg – Theophil Hansen and his work.
- Das monvment von Adamklissi, Tropaevm Traiana (1895), with Grigore George Tocilescu – The monument of Adamclisi, Tropaeum Traiani.
- Ara Pacis Avgvstae (1902), with Eugen Petersen – Ara Pacis Augustae.
- Der Palast Diokletians in Spalato (1910) – The Palace of Diocletian in Spalato.
