= Arthur Stein (historian) =

Austrian-Czech historian and epigrapher (1871–1950)

Arthur Stein (10 June 1871, in Vienna – 15 November 1950, in Prague) was an Austrian-Czech historian and epigrapher.

From 1892 to 1897 he studied history, archaeology and epigraphy at the University of Vienna, where his teachers were Eugen Bormann, Otto Benndorf and Emil Szántó. Following graduation, he took an extended study trip to Bulgaria, Italy, Greece and Asia Minor. In 1915 he obtained his habilitation for classical history and archaeology at the University of Prague, where in 1922 he was named a full professor of Roman archaeology and epigraphy. Because of his Jewish heritage, he was imprisoned at Theresienstadt concentration camp from July 1942 to May 1945.

With Edmund Groag, he published three volumes of the second edition of the Prosopographia Imperii Romani (1933–43).

== Selected works ==
- Die kaiserlichen Verwaltungsbeamten unter Severus Alexander, 1912 – The imperial administrative officers under Severus Alexander.
- Untersuchungen zur geschichte und verwaltung Aegyptens unter roemischer herrschaft, 1915 – Studies on the history and administration of Egypt under Roman rule.
- Nietzsche und die Wissenschaft, 1921 – Friedrich Nietzsche and science.
- Der Begriff des Verstehens bei Dilthey (2nd edition, 1926) – The concept of "understanding" in regards to Wilhelm Dilthey.
- Römische Inschriften in der antiken Literatur, 1931 – Roman inscriptions in ancient literature.
- Die Legaten von Moesien. Moesia Helytartói, 1940 – The legates of Moesia.
- Die Präfekten von Ägypten in der römischen Kaiserzeit, 1950 – The prefects of Egypt in the Roman Empire.
