= Emil Szántó =

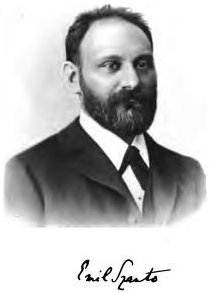
Emil Szántó

Emil Szántó (22 November 1857, in Vienna – 14 December 1904, in Vienna) was a classical historian and epigrapher from Austria-Hungary.

From 1875 he studied philology and history at the University of Vienna, receiving his doctorate in 1880. As a student, his teachers were Otto Hirschfeld, Theodor Gomperz, Otto Benndorf, Alexander Conze and Wilhelm von Hartel. In 1887 he took a study trip to Greece and Asia Minor, and during the same year, obtained his habilitation for ancient history at the university. In 1893 he became an associate professor, and shortly afterwards, conducted epigraphic research in Asia Minor with Eduard Hula. In 1901 he attained a full professorship in classical studies at Vienna.

With Carl Grünberg, Ludo Moritz Hartmann and Stephan Bauer, he was an editor of the Zeitschrift für Social- und Wirthschaftsgeschichte ("Journal of Social and Economic History"). He also edited numerous articles in the Realencyclopädie der classischen Altertumswissenschaft.

== Selected works ==
- Untersuchungen ueber das attische Bürgerrecht, 1881 – Investigations on Attic civil rights.
- Zur Geschichte von Thasos, 1890 – History of Thasos.
- Zur Geschichte des griechischen Alphabets, 1890 – History of the Greek alphabet.
- Das Kabirenheiligtum bei Theben. VII. Inschriften, 1890 – The Kabiri shrine at Thebes; VII Inscriptions.
- Das griechische Bürgerrecht, 1892 – Greek civil rights.
- Bericht über eine Reise in Karien (with Eduard Hula, 1894) – Report on an expedition to Caria.
- Zur antiken Wirthschaftsgeschichte, 1896 – On ancient economic history.
- Die griechischen Phylen, 1901 – Greek phylae.
- Ausgewählte Abhandlungen von Emil Szántó (edited by Heinrich Swoboda, 1906) – Selected essays of Emil Szántó.
