= Heinrich Schenkl =

Austrian classical philologist (1859 – 1919)

Heinrich Schenkl (29 January 1859, Innsbruck – 3 December 1919, Vienna) was an Austrian classical philologist. He was the son of classical philologist Karl Schenkl.

From 1876 to 1880 he studied classical philology, archaeology and philosophy at the University of Vienna, where his instructors included Theodor Gomperz and Wilhelm von Hartel. For several years he worked as a gymnasium teacher in Vienna, and in 1892 became an associate professor at the University of Graz. From 1896 onward, he served as a full professor at Graz, being named university dean in 1899. In 1917 he appointed professor of classical philology at the University of Vienna.

== Published works ==
Schenkl was editor of the three volume Bibliotheca patrum latinorum britannica (1891–1908). The following is a list of his noted original works and other editions:

- Plautinische studien, 1881 – Plautine studies.
- Zur Textesgeschichte der Eclogen des Calpurnius und Nemesianus, 1883 – Textual history on the eclogue of Titus Calpurnius Siculus and Nemesianus.
- Die Epiktetischen Fragmente. Eine Untersuchung zur Überlieferungsgeschichte der griechischen Florilegien, 1888 – Epictetus fragments: a study on the traditional history of Greek florilegium.

As an editor:

- Florilegia duo graeca, 1888.
- Epicteti Dissertationes ab Arriano digestae, 1894.
- Themistii in Aristotelis Physica paraphrasis, 1900.
- Sancti Ambrosii Opera. Pars Quarta, 1902 in: Corpus Scriptorum Ecclesiasticorum Latinorum.
- Marci Antonini imperatoris in semet ipsum libri XII, 1913.
- Themistii Orationes quae supersunt; (1965 ff.) edition of Themistius, part of series "Bibliotheca scriptorum Graecorum et Romanorum Teubneriana".
