= Dov Yermiya =

Israeli writer

- דב ירמיה
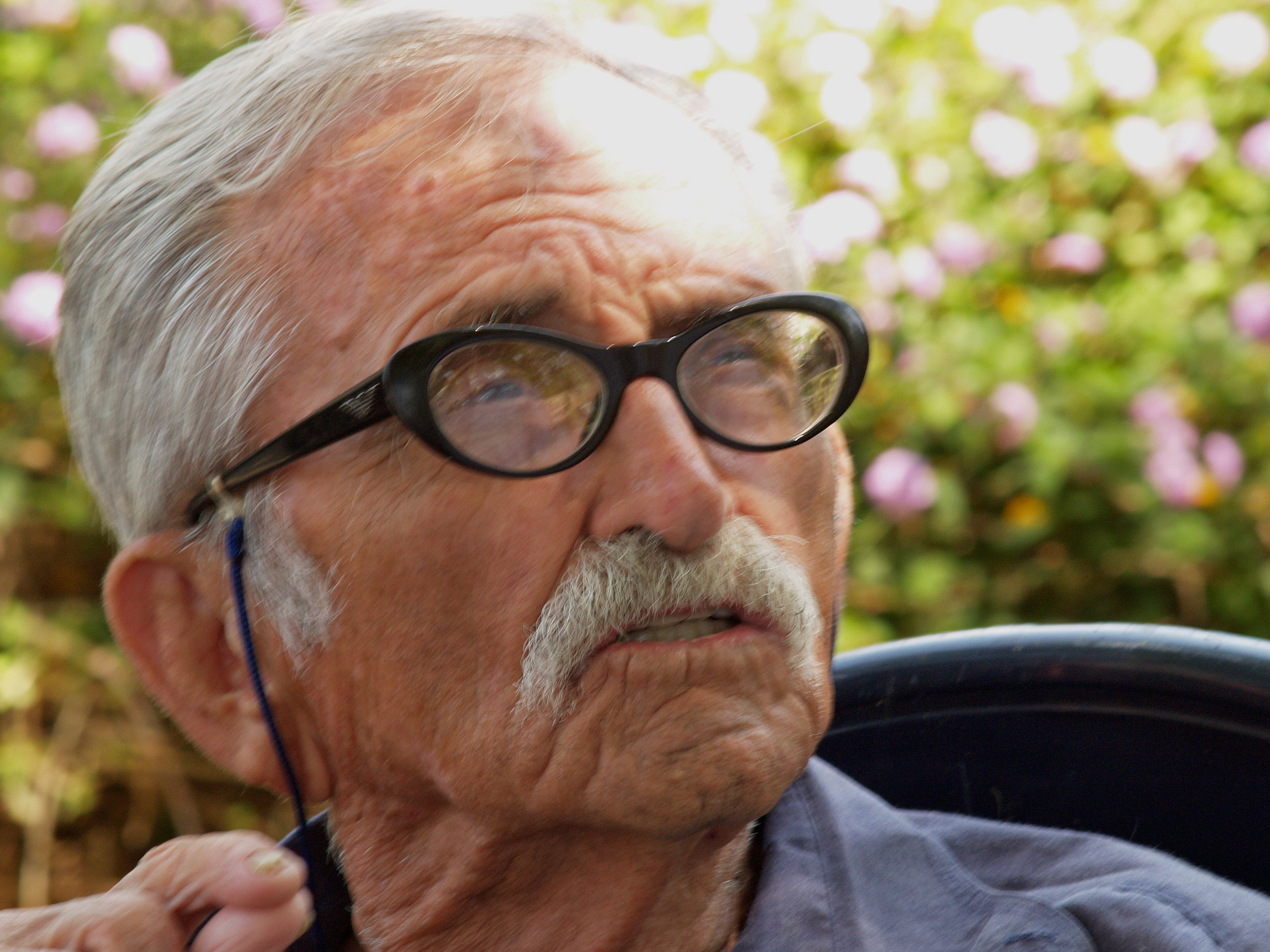
- Born: October 24, 1914; Beit-Gan, Ottoman Empire
- Died: January 30, 2016 (aged 101); Eilon, Israel
- Military career
- Allegiance: United Kingdom; Israel
- Branch: Haganah; British Army; Israeli Ground Forces
- Service years: 1929–1958
- Rank: Lieutenant Colonel
- Units: Palestinian Transport Corps; Palmach
- Conflicts: Arab revolt in Palestine; World War II; Jewish revolt in Palestine; 1948 Arab–Israeli War; 1982 Lebanon War

Dov Yermiya (Hebrew: דב ירמיה; October 24, 1914 – January 30, 2016) was an Israeli military officer and political activist who became notable for severely criticizing Israeli military actions.

== Early life ==
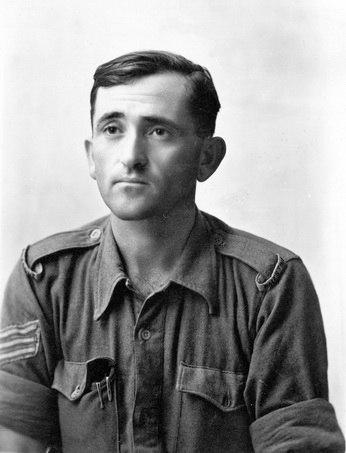
Yermiya in the British Army, 1943

Dov Yermiya was born on moshav Beit Gan, now a part of Yavne'el, in what was then Ottoman Palestine in 1914. His parents, David and Bella Yirmanovich, had immigrated to Palestine from the Russian Empire as part of the Second Aliyah. His mother had been romantically involved with Joseph Trumpeldor before marrying his father. In 1921, his family moved to moshav Nahalal, where he grew up. Moshe Dayan was a childhood friend of his. In school, he displayed musical talent, and at age 15, he conducted a student's choir and composed melodies.

As a teenager, Yermiya joined the Haganah in 1929, and defended Nahalal during the 1929 Palestine riots. In 1934, he left Nahalal to study music in Tel Aviv. While studying music, he joined Hashomer Hatzair. In 1937, his parents separated, although they never divorced, with his father moving to kibbutz Beit Alfa and his mother moving to Hadera. He maintained a close relationship with each of them until their deaths.

During the 1936-1939 Arab revolt in Palestine, Yermiya joined the Special Night Squads. In 1938, he was among the founders of kibbutz Eilon, and became a member of the kibbutz. He participated in a battle for kibbutz Hanita, and was appointed regional commander of the area. After World War II broke out, Yermiya joined the British Army and served in the 462nd General Transport Company. He participated in the North African and Middle Eastern fronts and the invasion of Italy. He was subsequently deployed to Germany. At the end of the war, he was a member of the Haganah's elite strike unit, the Palmach, and participated in Palmach operations to smuggle illegal Jewish immigrants into Palestine as part of Aliyah Bet.

Yermiya's views on Zionism were moderate. He advocated for a binational state in the mid-1930s.

== Israeli military career ==
During the 1948 Arab–Israeli War, Yermiya served in the Israel Defense Forces as a company commander. He participated in fighting in the Eastern and Western Galilee, and the conquest of Nazareth. He was the officer who directed the assault that ended in the conquest of Saffuriyah in Operation Dekel, and his memory of the event confirms the version of events given by the Palestinians who fled. He was a deputy battalion commander in the Carmeli Brigade during Operation Hiram, which saw Israel capture the Upper Galilee and invade southern Lebanon, which was temporarily occupied by the Israelis. During the occupation of southern Lebanon, an officer under Yermiya's command, First Lieutenant Shmuel Lahis, was one of the two Israeli officers responsible for the Hula massacre, in which dozens of people in the village of Hula were killed. When Yermiya learned of this, he filed a complaint that led to the two officers' trial and conviction in a military court.

After the war, Yermiya continued to serve in the army, eventually reaching the rank of Lieutenant Colonel. His second wife, Hadassah Mor, whom he married during this time, claimed he had developed Communist views, and wrote that "Stalin... was Dov's God." In 1958, he retired from the army.

== Civilian life ==
After retiring from his military career, Yermiya became a member of kibbutz Sarid, where he worked in agriculture and as a Hebrew teacher for new immigrants. Later, he left Sarid and settled in Nahariya, where he lived for most of his life before returning to Eilon in his final years. He was active in struggling for equal rights for Israeli-Arabs. In particular, he protested the imposition of military rule over Arab areas, which was in effect until 1966, and turned down an appointment that would have made him Military Governor of Nazareth. He was one of the founding members of the Nature and Parks Authority in the Northern District, which later became part of the Israel Nature and Parks Authority. He worked there until his retirement in 1979. After his retirement, he became the security coordinator for the Ga'aton Regional Council.

== Reserve military and police service ==
In 1967, General David Elazar, who commanded the IDF's Northern Command, appointed Yermiya commander of the regional defense of Kiryat Shmona, and from then on, he did reserve duty on a voluntary basis. In 1974, one day after the Ma'alot massacre, he established the Civil Guard in Nahariya and served as its commander. Five weeks later, he participated in action against Palestinian infiltrators during the 1974 Nahariya attack. In 1976, when the Good Fence opened, he served as a reservist in the military government unit. During the 1978 Israeli invasion of Lebanon, he served as an administrative and service officer in the military government unit, which became a unit dealing with assistance for civilians.

=== 1982 Lebanon War ===
During the 1982 Lebanon War, Yermiya, aged 68, volunteered for service. He served in the civilian assistance unit, and was shocked by what he witnessed. In his diary account of the battle to capture the refugee camp of Ain al-Hilweh, one of the fiercest battles of the war, he wrote that the aerial and artillery assault on the camp reminded him of World War II. He called the war a mistake, and wrote "we've become a nation of savage thugs." He published his war diary in a newspaper. As a result of his public criticisms of the war, he was dismissed from the army. His commanding officer wrote that his words could have been written by a PLO propagandist. Yermiya also resigned from his job as security coordinator for the Ga'aton Regional Council.

The following year he became famous when he released his war diary as a book, My War Diary: Lebanon June 5 -- July 1, 1982. Published in defiance of censorship laws, it provoked, according to the publishers, 'widespread controversy when it was first published in Israel', but was ignored by Western media. The book criticized Israeli actions during the war, and was first published in Hebrew with the title "Yoman Hamilchama Sheli" (My War Diary). In 1984 it was published in English by South End Press. The book was given some attention by Western intellectuals, such as the US writer Noam Chomsky. In 1983, Yermiya was the recipient of a Human Rights Award from the Association for Civil Rights for his work in relieving the suffering of Lebanese civilians during hostilities.

== Later activism ==
After his dismissal from the army, Yermiya continued to assist Palestinian refugees in Lebanon as a private citizen. According to Edward Alexander, in a chapter surveying what he calls 'Antisemitism, Israeli-style,' Yermiya is said to have made a profession of giving speeches around the world that draw on an analogy between Israel and Nazi Germany, and to have affirmed in an interview that he and his friends thought as early as 1945 that the Holocaust would "affect Jews in Israel ... for the bad." In 1986, he met PLO officials in Romania, at a time when associating with the PLO was a criminal offense. When the First Intifada broke out, he urged Israeli soldiers to refuse to serve in the Palestinian territories, and was arrested on suspicion of incitement.

== Final years and death ==
In the last years of his life, Yermiya expressed his opinion that Zionism was a failure, and that the State of Israel was ultimately doomed. In July 2009, he wrote to friends expressing his despair at the situation in Israel and Palestine, and concluding

Therefore I, a 95-year-old Sabra, who has plowed its fields, planted trees, built a house and fathered sons, grandsons and great-grandsons, and also shed his blood in the battle for the founding of the State of Israel, Declare herewith that I renounce my belief in the Zionism which has failed, that I shall not be loyal to the Jewish fascist state and its mad visions, that I shall not sing anymore its nationalist anthem, that I shall stand at attention only on the days of mourning for those fallen on both sides in the wars, and that I look with a broken heart at an Israel that is committing suicide and at the three generations of offspring that I have bred and raised in it.

— Dov Yermiya in July 2009

In a 2011 interview for The Last Zionist, a film about his life, he stated "I've lived under three regimes in this country: four years with the Turks, 30 years with the British and now with Israel…I see no future for my offspring in this country. We’re heading for ruin and destruction. I think the state won’t exist in 50-100 years."

Yermiya died on 30 January 2016, at his home on Kibbutz Eilon.

== Personal life ==
Yermiya had two daughters, Roni and Avigail, with his first wife, Gronia. In the 1950s, while commanding a training base for new recruits, he met his second wife, Hadassah Mor, who was 16 years his junior. She had come to the base to be a teacher to new recruits, but Yermiya chose her to be his secretary. A romantic relationship developed, and Yermiya divorced Gronia to marry her. In 1956, their son Raz was born. Yermiya introduced Mor to his friend, Moshe Dayan, and divorced her when he found out that she and Dayan were having an affair. Enraged by the affair, he wrote an angry letter to Dayan, and tried to block Dayan's career advancement. He later married his third wife, Menuha. At the time of his death, he had 12 grandchildren and 16 great-grandchildren.
