= Karl Schenkl =

Austrian classical philologist (1827–1900)

Karl Schenkl (Brno, 11 December 1827 – Graz, 20 September 1900) was an Austrian classical philologist.

== Biography ==
Schenkl studied classical philology and law from 1845 to 1849 at the University of Vienna. After 1850 he taught at various gymnasiums, and in 1858 was appointed professor of classical philology at the University of Innsbruck, where he founded the Philological Institute in 1860. In 1863, he left for the University of Graz, and in the same year started a philological seminar and became a corresponding member of the Austrian Academy of Sciences; in 1868 he became a full member. Schenkl was rector at Graz from 1869 to 1870, and in 1870 became a member of the Gymnasialreformkommission (commission for the reform of the gymnasiums). In 1875, he was appointed professor at the University of Vienna.

Schenkl was co-founder in 1885 and president of the "Eranos Vindobonensis", a historical society associated with the University of Vienna's Institute for Classical Philology, Middle and Late Latin. With Wilhelm von Hartel he founded, in 1879, the journal Wiener Studien, and he was publisher of the series Bibliotheca Teubneriana. Schenkl edited Latin texts by the Church Fathers and others for the Corpus Scriptorum Ecclesiasticorum Latinorum (CSEL), and published a number of important textbooks; his Griechisches Elementarbuch (1852) was used in Austrian schools for 70 years, and his students' dictionary of Ancient Greek was still in use in 2009. His interests also extended to Sanskrit, his lectures on which paved the way for the later foundation of the chair of comparative linguistics at Graz, and fairytales; his 1864 article "Das Märchen von Schneewittchen und Shakespeare's Cymbeline" is one of the earliest studies of "Snow White".

In 1919 a plaque honoring Schenkl was unveiled in the arcaded courtyard of the University of Vienna. He was the father of philologist Heinrich Schenkl.

== Selected works ==
=== For the CSEL ===
- Ambrose, Hexameron, De paradiso, De Cain, De Noe, De Abraham, De Isaac, De bono mortis. 1896, Vol. 32/1
- Ambrose, De Iacob, De Ioseph, De patriarchis, De fuga saeculi, De interpellatione Iob et David, De apologia prophetae David, De Helia, De Nabuthae, De Tobia. 1897, Vol. 32/2
- Ambrose, Expositio evangelii secundum Lucam. 1902, Vol. 32/4
- Sancti Paulini epigramma, Versus ad gratiam domini, De verbi incarnatione, De ecclesia. 1888, Vol. 16/1
- Claudius Marius Victor, Alethia. 1888, Vol. 16/1
- Faltonia Betitia Proba, Cento. 1888, Vol. 16/1

== Sources ==
- Kurt Smolak: "Schenkl Karl". In: Österreichisches Biographisches Lexikon 1815–1950 (ÖBL). Vol. 10, Austrian Academy of Sciences, Vienna 1994, ISBN 3-7001-2186-5, p. 83 f. (Direct links to "p. 83", "p. 84")
- Schenkl, Karl, in: Deutsche Biographische Enzyklopädie, vol. 8, p. 607
- Alois Kernbauer: "Karl Schenkl (1863/64-1875)". In Das Fach Klassische Philologie an der Universität Graz vom Anfang des 19. Jahrhunderts bis zur Gegenwart. Mit Beiträgen von Herbert H. Egglmaier, Walter Höflechner, Alois Kernbauer, Walter Primig, Peter G. Tropper, Franz-Anton Wallisch. Beiträge und Materialien zur Geschichte der Wissenschaften in Österreich Ed. Walter Höflechner (Publikationen aus dem Archiv der Universität Graz 11), Graz 1981, 38–52.
