= Eugen Petersen =

German classical archaeologist and philologist

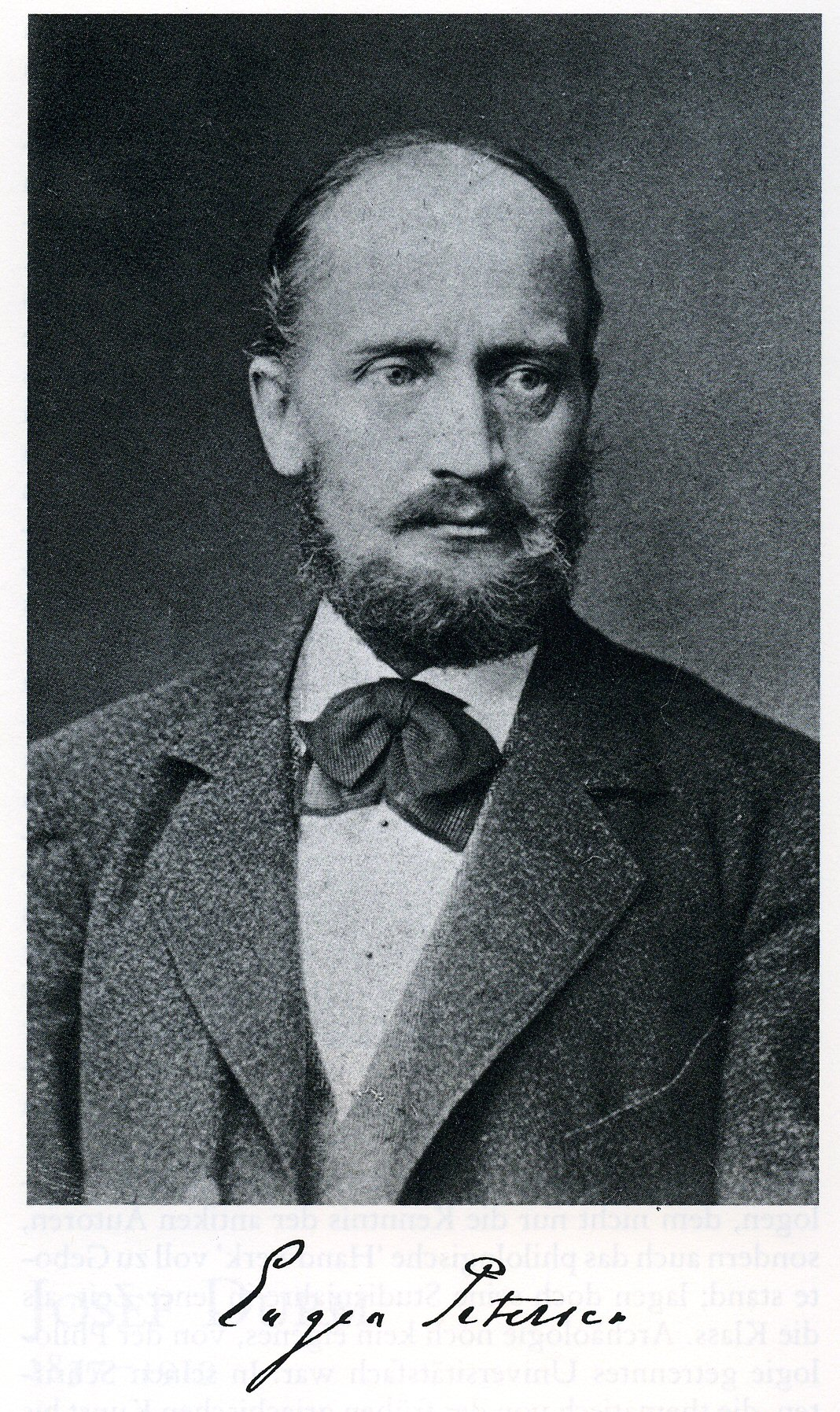
Eugen Adolf Hermann Petersen

Eugen Adolf Hermann Petersen (16 August 1836 in Heiligenhafen – 14 December 1919 in Hamburg) was a German classical archaeologist and philologist.

He studied classical philology at the universities of Kiel and Bonn, where his influences were Friedrich Gottlieb Welcker, Friedrich Ritschl and Otto Jahn. In 1859 he received his doctorate at Kiel with a thesis on Theophrastus. Following graduation he worked at the Istituto di Corrispondenza Archeologica in Rome, during which time, he investigated the recently discovered tombs of Via Latina.

In 1862, he obtained his habilitation for classical philology at the University of Erlangen. From 1864, he taught classes at the gymnasium in Husum, then from 1869 worked in a similar capacity in Plon. From 1873 to 1879, he served as a professor of classical philology and archaeology at the Imperial University of Dorpat, and afterwards was named a successor to Otto Benndorf at the University of Prague.

From 1882 to 1885, with Benndorf, Felix von Luschan, Karol Lanckoroński and others, he participated in archaeological investigations in Asia Minor, about which, the treatises "Reisen in Lykien, Milyas und Kibyratis" (1889) and "Städte Pamphyliens und Pisidiens" (1890-92) were published. In 1886, he was chosen first secretary of the German Archaeological Institute (DAI) in Athens, and during the following year, succeeded Wilhelm Henzen as manager of the DAI in Rome.

== Selected works ==
- Die Kunst des Pheidias am Parthenon und zu Olympia, 1873 – The art of Phidias at the Parthenon and at Olympia.
- Reisen in Lykien, Milyas und Kibyratis (with Felix von Luschan), 1889 – Journey to Lycia, Milyas and Kibyra.
- Städte Pamphyliens und Pisidiens (with George Niemann and Karol Lanckoroński), 2 volumes, 1890–92 – Cities of Pamphylia and Pisidia.
- Die Marcus-Säule auf Piazza Colonna in Rom (with Alfred von Domaszewski and Guglielmo Calderini), 1896 – The Column of Marcus Aurelius at the Piazza Colonna in Rome.
- Trajans Dakische Kriege (2 volumes, 1899–1903) – Trajan's Dacian Wars.
- Vom alten Rom (second edition, 1900) – On ancient Rome.
- Die Burgtempel der Athenaia, 1907 – The castle temple of Athena.
- Die attische Tragödie als Bild- und Bühnenkunst, 1915 – The Attican tragedy as image and stage art.
