= Heiligenhafen =

- Town
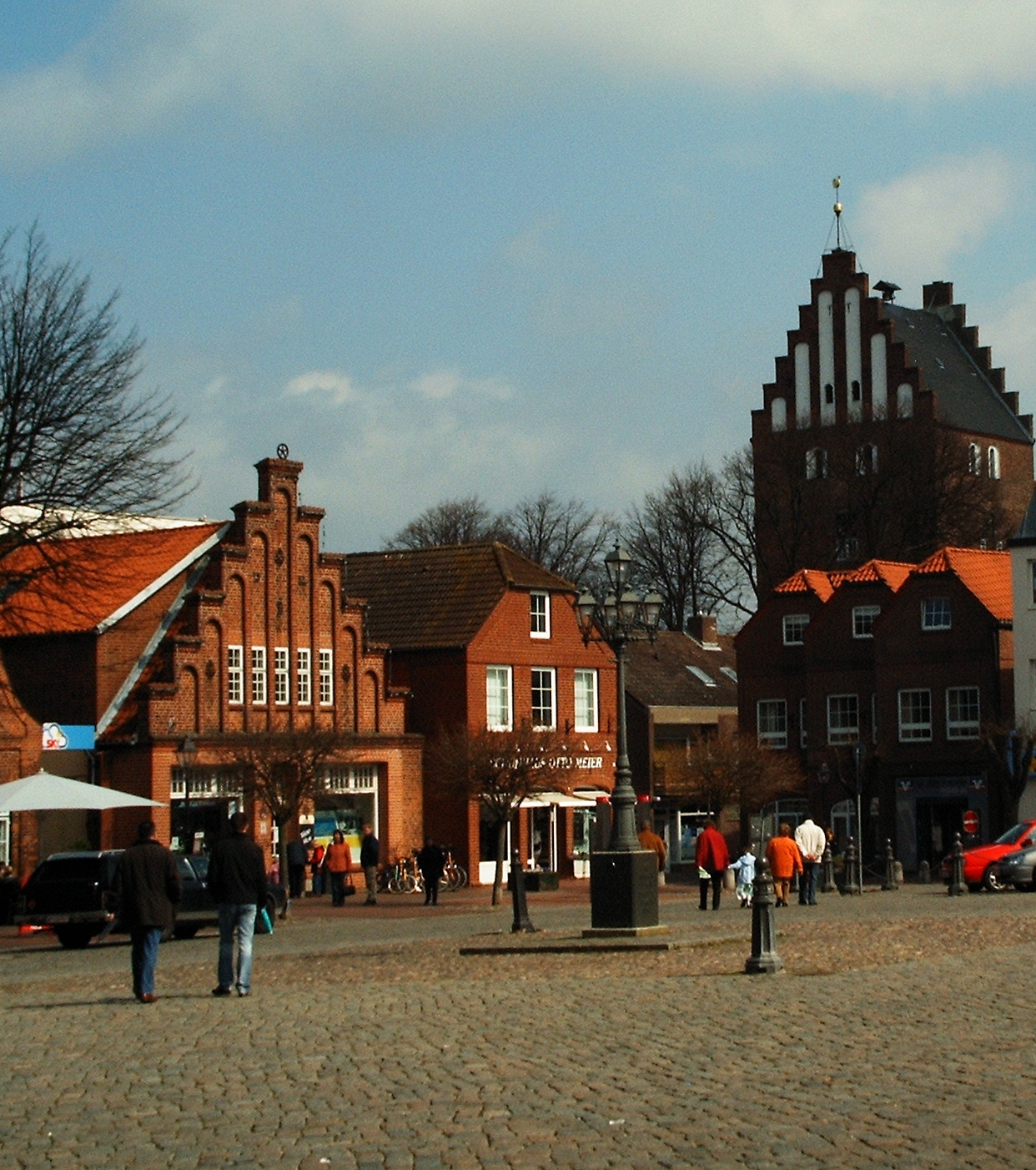
- marketplace in Heiligenhafen, April 2006

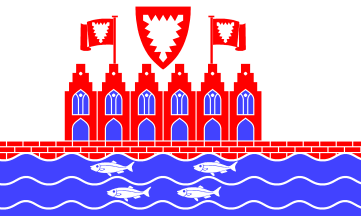
- Flag Coat of arms

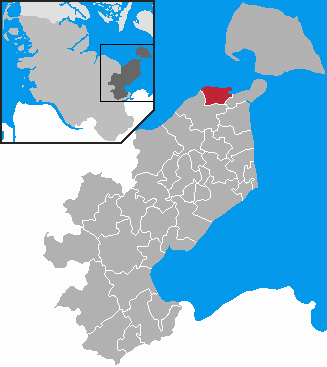
- Location of Heiligenhafen within Ostholstein district
- Interactive map of Heiligenhafen
- Location within Germany Location within Schleswig-Holstein
- Coordinates: 54°22′26″N 10°58′47″E
- Country: Germany
- State: Schleswig-Holstein
- District: Ostholstein

Government
  - Mayor: Kuno Brandt

Area
  - Total: 18.32 km^{2} (7.07 sq mi)
- Elevation: 7 m (23 ft)

Population (2025-12-31)
  - Total: 9,501
  - Density: 518.6/km^{2} (1,343/sq mi)
- Time zone: UTC+01:00 (CET)
  - Summer (DST): UTC+02:00 (CEST)
- Postal codes: 23771–23774
- Dialling codes: 04362
- Vehicle registration: OH
- Website: www.heiligenhafen.de

Heiligenhafen (German pronunciation: [haɪlɪɡn̩ˈhaːfn̩]; Holsatian: Hilligenhaven) is a town in the district of Ostholstein, in Schleswig-Holstein, Germany. It is situated on the Baltic Sea coast, opposite the island Fehmarn, approx. 60 km northeast of Lübeck, and 55 km east of Kiel.

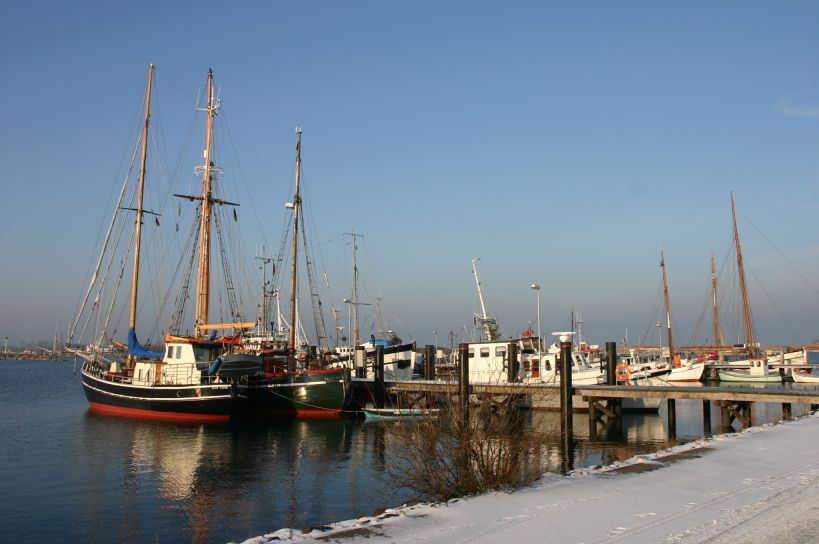
Port

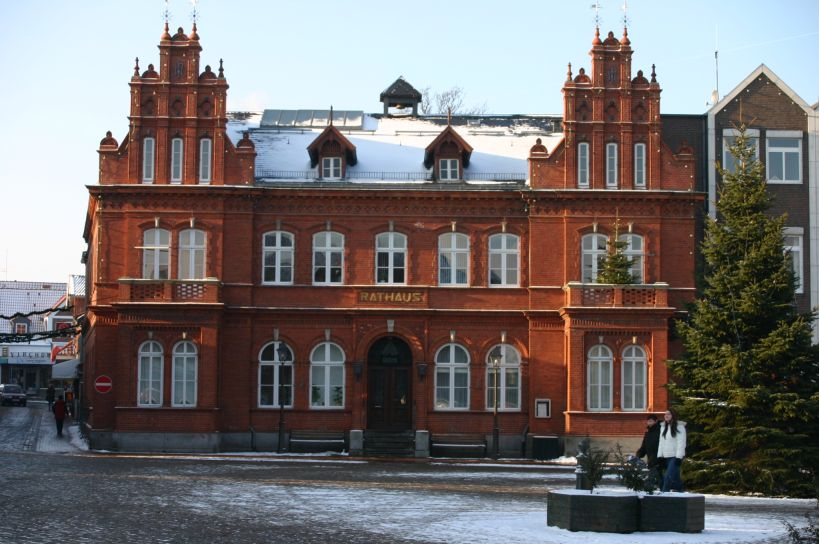
Town hall

== Geography ==
The town centre is located on a small bight, the binnensee (inland lake) from which the west of the town has been separated. Two headlands are located off the coast: Steinwarder and Graswarder, the latter one is a bird sanctuary.

== Economy ==
A little fishing port and a marina with about 1000 moorings is located at the open part of the bight close to the town centre. Tourism is an important part of the economy of the town. Every summer the main attraction is a 10-day festival called 'Hafenfest Tage' (harbour festival) which attracts visitors from all over the country. The town just celebrated its 250-year anniversary and has kept the charm of the traditional German fishing town though some well designed amendments to the town centre have been made.

== Born in Heiligenhafen ==
- Eugen Petersen (1836-1919), archaeologist
- Wilhelm Jensen (1837-1911), lyricist and writer

== Connected to Heiligenhafen ==
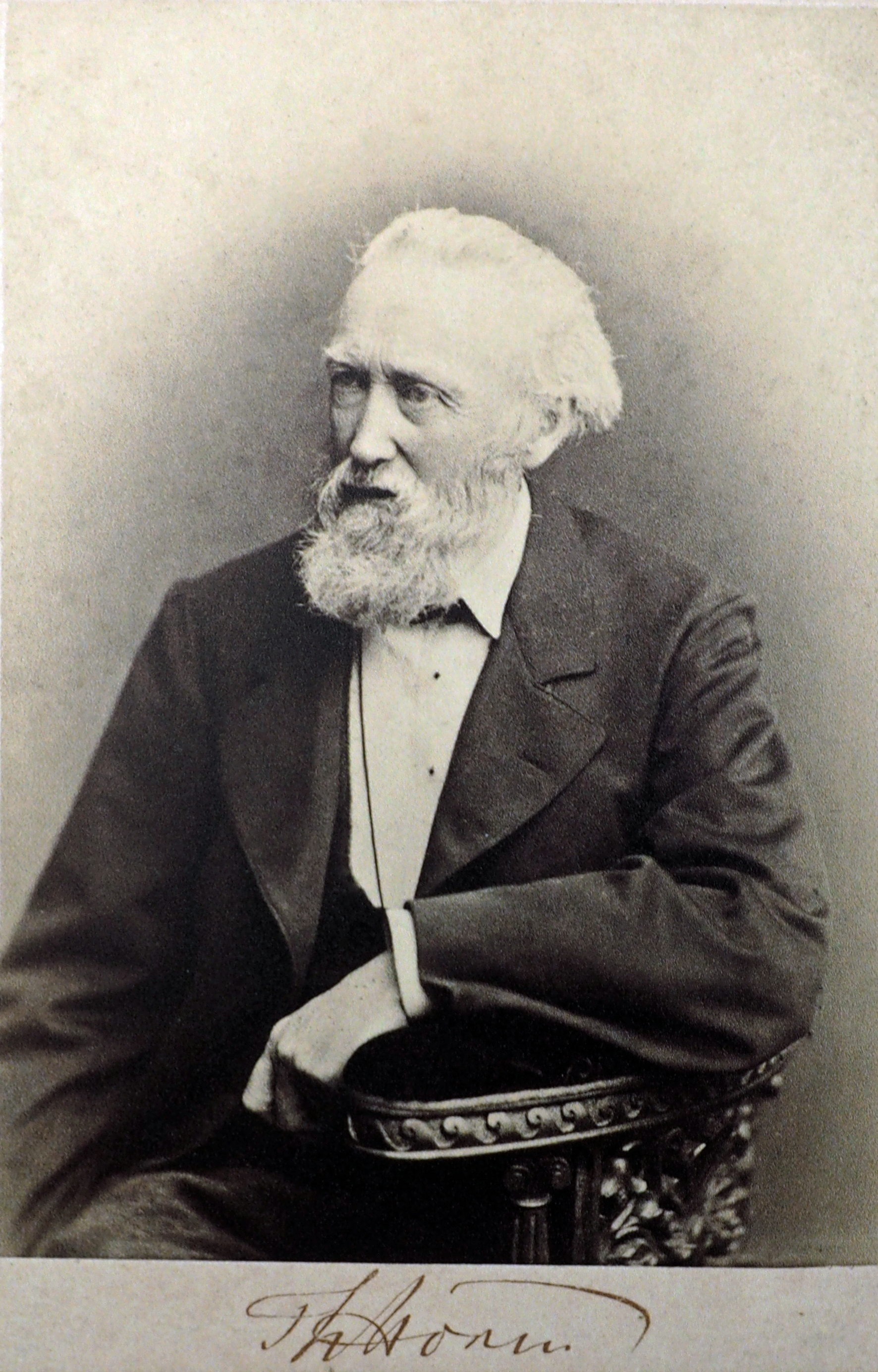
Theodor Storm

- Theodor Storm (1817-1888) jurist and famous writer, was inspired by a stay in Heiligenhafen in 1881 to write the novella Hans and Heinz Kirch, which is set here.
- Fritz Graßhoff (1913-1997), draftsman, painter, and writer, was interned here after the Second World War and in 1945 wrote his Heiligenhafen Sternsingerspiel ("Heiligenhafen Caroler's Play")
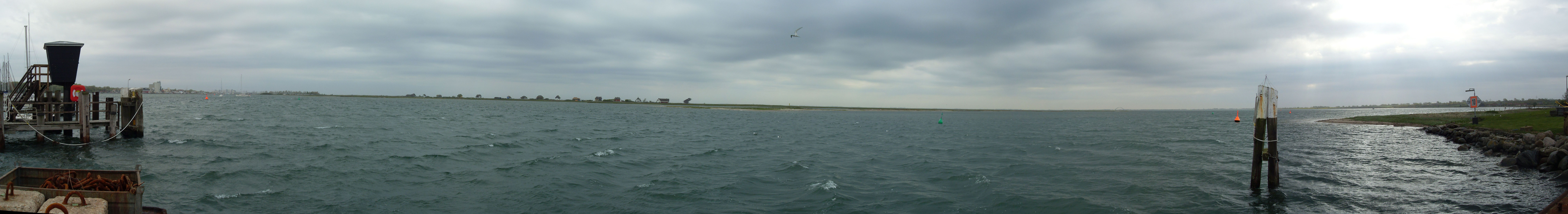
Panorama from the district Warteburg to Heiligenhafen (left), Graswarder and in the Fehmarnsund with the Fehmarnsund Bridge.
