= Trysa =

Ancient Lycian town

Coordinates: 36°16′09″N 29°54′21″E

Trysa or Tryssa was a town of ancient Lycia, located between Cyaneae and Myra. It has been archaeologically examined, and among the finds are Lycian tombs, most notably the Heroon of Trysa. Greek inscriptions which were found there show that there was a cult of Zeus Eleutherios and of Helios at Trysa. The town was also inhabited during the Byzantine period and there was a church on the acropolis.

Its site is located near the modern town of Gölbaşı, Asiatic Turkey.

== See also ==
- Heroon of Trysa
