= Otto Hirschfeld =

German epigraphist and professor of ancient history

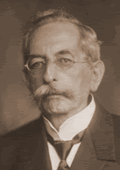
Otto Hirschfeld (1843-1922)

Otto Hirschfeld (March 16, 1843 – March 27, 1922) was a German epigraphist and professor of ancient history who was a native of Königsberg.

In 1863 received a doctorate from the University of Königsberg, and in 1869 became a professor at the University of Göttingen. In 1872 he became a professor of classical studies at the University of Prague, and in 1876 a professor of epigraphy and ancient history at the University of Vienna. In 1885 he succeeded Theodor Mommsen (1817-1903) as professor of ancient history at the University of Berlin, where he remained until his retirement in 1917.

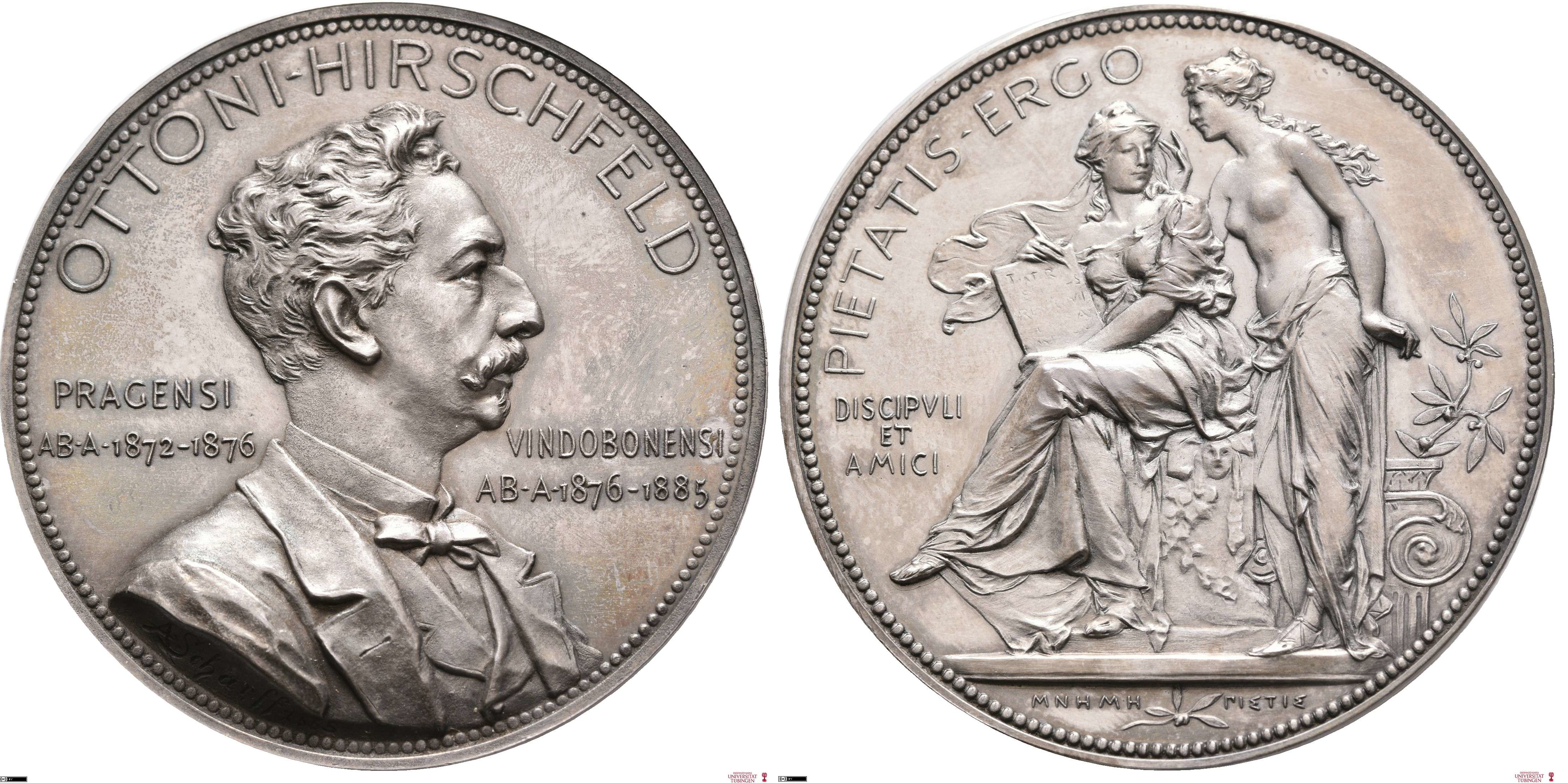
Medaille Otto Hirschfeld 1885

At Vienna he organized the Archaeologic-Epigraphic Seminary with archaeologist Alexander Conze (1831-1914). Hirschfeld edited several volumes of the Corpus Inscriptionum Latinarum, in which he largely dealt with inscriptions of Gaul and Germania. Other writings include: Untersuchungen auf dem Gebiete der römischen Verwaltungsgeschichte (1876), Inscriptiones Galliae Narbonensis Latinae CIL Vol XII (1888) and Inscriptiones Aquitaniae et Lugdunensis (1899).

In occasion of leaving the University of Vienna in 1885 he received a medal initiated by friends and students.
