= Heroon of Trysa =

380 CE Tomb in ancient Lycia, Turkey

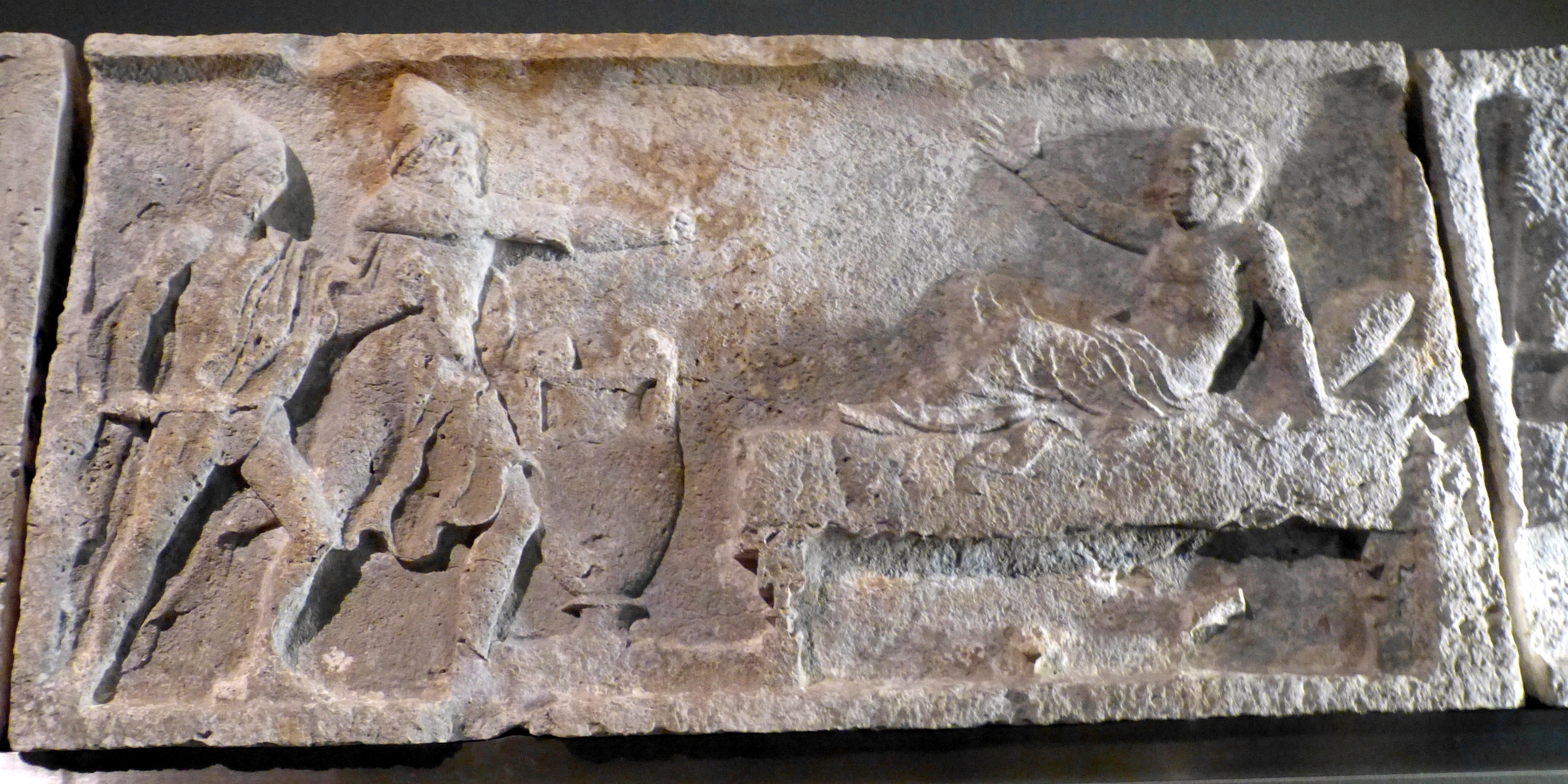
Relief plaque (380 BCE) with the slaying of the suitors by Odysseus, from the Heroon of Trysa, Kunsthistorisches Museum, Wien

The Heroon of Trysa is the modern name for an ancient tomb, built around 380 BCE in Trysa, in ancient Lycia in southwest Turkey. It was discovered in 1841 by the gymnasium teacher Julius August Schönborn during his field research in Lycia.

The figural frieze originally consisted of c. 152 plates, which decorated the square outer wall of the tomb. They are currently in the Kunsthistorisches Museum in Vienna, where they were brought in 1882 after excavations by Otto Benndorf and Felix von Luschan, with the permission of the Turkish authorities. The Kunsthistorisches Museum carried out a research project on the plates which resulted in 2015 in a published catalogue with a detailed description of each of the plates, including measurements, conservation status, and stylistic analysis of the figures, illustrated with photographs of the restored plaques.

== Bibliography ==
- Wolfgang Oberleitner, Das Heroon von Trysa – Ein lykisches Fürstengrab des 4.Jh.n.Chr.; Antike Welt, Sonderheft 1994
- Alice Landskron, Das Heroon von Trysa : Ein Denkmal in Lykien zwischen Ost und West : Untersuchungen zu Bildschmuck, Bauform und Grabinhaber, Vienna : Holzhausen, 2015
