= Eduard Hula =

Eduard Hula (25 September 1862, in Prague – 26 September 1902, in Vienna) was an Austrian classical archaeologist and epigrapher.

He studied classical philology, archaeology and epigraphy at the University of Vienna, receiving his doctorate in 1889. Later on, he taught classes at gymnasiums in Brünn and Vienna. In 1892/93, with a scholarship from the Austrian Academy of Sciences, he conducted research in Italy and Greece, and in 1894, along with epigrapher Emil Szántó, he performed investigations in Asia Minor. In 1901 he was named secretary of the Österreichisches Archäologisches Institut.

== Selected works ==
- Eine Inschrift aus Lagina, 1888 – An inscription at Lagina.
- Epigraphisches aus Spalato 1890 – Epigraphy at Spalato.
- Eine Judengemeinde in Tlos, 1893 – The Jewish community at Tlos.
- Bericht über eine Reise in Karien (with Emil Szántó, 1894) – Report on an expedition to Caria.
- Beiträge zu den Arvalacten, 1894 – Contributions concerning Arval Acts.
- Die Toga der spǎteren Kaiserzeit, 1895 – The toga of the later imperial period.
- "Clavus 2". In: Pauly's Realencyclopädie der classischen Altertumswissenschaft (RE). Band IV,1 (1900), Sp. 4–9.
- Römische Altertümer, 1901 – Roman antiquities.
