= Stefan Hula =

Stefan Hula may refer to:

- Stefan Hula Jr. (born 1986), Polish ski jumper
- Stefan Hula Sr. (1947–2025), Polish Nordic combined skier
