= HULA =

Hawaiian artist

Sean Yoro (born 1989), known professionally as HULA, is a self-taught contemporary artist, most known for his murals positioned near or in large bodies of water. He has developed a distinct style merging fine art, street art and nature. In 2015 HULA became widely known and publicized for his viral iceberg murals, which sparked a larger environmental discussion. The Hawaiian native has been known for his delicate portraits of half-submerged women’s faces on icebergs across the worlds such as the Arctic Circle and Iceland in order to raise awareness of climate change and the effects on the environment. Since then, many of his pieces have suggested climate change issues at the root of their message.

HULA’s medium to convey his art was artificial reefs, using concrete and steel in hopes to replicate an environment for marine life to grow. For this project, HULA made his own materials and eco-friendly pigment sticks. In the interview Street Artists Learns Freediving to Paint Underwater on Artificial Reefs by Jessica Stewart, HULA stated “Combining both my art and environmental passions happened almost by accident at first, when I started creating murals along ocean walls. I always had underlying messages of sustainability and awareness, but this was the first concept I could literally combine these two aspects of my life influences into one. Every project since then has seamlessly integrated both values into their own unique stories naturally”. HULA’s passion for environmental reform has been noticed by the public, being most notable for painting on icebergs of indigenous local woman to raise awareness of global warming and the effects it has on the native people living near those environments at risk. HULA exhibits his passion for helping his home state of Hawai’i to protect and help the marine life that has an impact on the islands.

== Early life ==
Yoro grew up on the eastside of Oahu. He spent most of his time surfing, until his late teens when he discovered his passion for graffiti and tattooing. He started his career in 2010 after taking a drawing class at Windward Community College on Oahu. Shortly after he relocated to Brooklyn, New York working under the alias 'HULA' to pursue fine art.

Prior to pursuing his art career, Yoro planned to work as a lifeguard for the Honolulu City and County Lifeguard. Midway through his safety training, Yoro changed his mind and pursued his interest in art. Despite the college drawing courses he took, Yoro credits his success as being self-taught by watching countless hours of YouTube tutorial videos and painted daily. Watching videos gained him the skills “to prep canvases with lasso, how to photograph his models and the knowledge to paint from small canvases to 24 foot murals.”

== Career ==
In 2015 he broke into the street art world, when the release of his water murals became widely publicized. HULA's work is created while balancing on his stand up paddleboard. He usually creates his works on the side of shipwrecks, abandoned docks and semi-submerged walls. Merging his backgrounds in both street and fine art, Hula works primarily with oil paint and uses traditional techniques to create female figures interacting with the surface of the water. HULA’s work often proposes an environmental discussion. HULA has worked on collaborations and has been hired by several commercial brands such as The North Face, Vans, Instagram/Facebook and Saks Fifth Avenue.

== Artwork ==
=== Deep Seads ===
HULA created a collection titled “Deap Seads” in December 2017, which included three underwater murals, Lumens, Breath, and Buried. HULA’s inspiration for this project was his advocacy for environmental changes. Painted underwater in the oceans of Hawaii, HULA spread awareness of the dying coral reef epidemic, affecting the biodiversity and environment worldwide. In the book, Environmental Law Issues in the South Pacific and the Quests for Sustainable Development and Good Governance by Laurence Cordonnery, he states that Pacific Islanders rely heavily on the biological resources that are needed for economic, social, and cultural well being. Lawrence also mentions that island environments are the most threatened. Due to HULA coming from a Pacific Islander ethnicity, it is a drive for him to raise awareness of the disastrous effects that are occurring in his home state and Pacific Islands. Though HULA isn’t only confined in painting for the Pacific Islands, he has also traveled to several locations where global warming has taken atoll in the environment.

During, his project HULA underwent intense training in order to accomplish his murals by freediving, diving underwater without scuba gear. In addition, without the help of an oxygen tank, HULA had to hold his breath for a short amount of time before reaching the surface for air. Under these intense conditions, HULA suffered from an ear drum rupture, consequently delaying his project further.

This mural signifies the importance of how the ocean’s marine life is such a precious gift to humanity and that it needs to be protected. HULA’s murals, Lumens is portrayed as a woman with her eyes closed and a jellyfish flowing next to her while her hand is raised up beside it. HULA’s medium to convey his art was artificial reefs, using concrete and steel in hopes to replicate an environment for marine life to grow. For this project, HULA made his own materials and eco-friendly pigment sticks. In the interview Street Artists Learns Freediving to Paint Underwater on Artificial Reefs by Jessica Stewart, HULA stated “Combining both my art and environmental passions happened almost by accident at first, when I started creating murals along ocean walls. I always had underlying messages of sustainability and awareness, but this was the first concept I could literally combine these two aspects of my life influences into one. Every project since then has seamlessly integrated both values into their own unique stories naturally”. HULA’s passion for environmental reform has been noticed by the public, being most notable for painting on icebergs of indigenous local woman to raise awareness of global warming and the effects it has on the native people living near those environments at risk. The warmer climate has led to the decline of oxygen resulting in the absence of species due to the lack of oxygen. Without oxygen, coral reefs are susceptible to the increasing levels of acidification, which contribute to the increasing levels of acidification will which has “impact on coral physiology (calcification rates, ability to repair tissues and growth), behavior (feeding rate), reproduction (early life-stage survival, timing of spawning), weaken calcified structures, and alter coral stress-response mechanisms.” HULA exhibits his passion for helping his home state of Hawai’i to protect and help the marine life that has an impact on the islands. In Breath, a woman with her eyes closed is facing towards the audience with bubbles coming out of her mouth. And Buried, is an eye covered by sand in the seafloor, with a depiction of one eye staring out, towards the surface of the water. Jacapo Prisco, writer for CNN, described HULA’s paintings in his article Artist Sean Yoro Paints Stunning Underwater Murals. Prisco states, “The first, titled ‘Lumens,’ ... and is meant to capture the moment he discovered how much beauty and magic the ocean holds, as well as the fragile state in which it currently is. The second, ‘Breath,’... is linked to the discovery of freediving, an activity that Yoro says requires as much control of the lungs as of the mind. The third, ‘Buried,’ is the image of an eye, symbolizing the fragility of the life that lives in the oceans today. The figure is being covered by the sand, representing the need to protect what is left before it's too late”. The message possibly conveys a powerful suggestion of awareness, in a symbolic manner, to keep eyes open on the consequences of environmental extinction, perseverance, and being buried in the culpability of human actions.

Yoro painted his murals with charcoal paint techniques which allowed the murals to have a contrast between dark and light tones that blended beautifully together. The materials used were also critical for HULA so he won’t harm the ecosystem, and later found after his project that algae started to form on his murals, demonstrating that his objective was a success. Katerina Papathanasiou, journalist and writer for Vale Magazine, states in her article, HULA’S Underwater Murals Bring Awareness to Dying Reefs, “In ‘Deep Seads,’ the ephemeral aspect of the murals is further intensified by the marine organisms that started covering the paintings as early as two weeks after completion. Over time, HULA’s artificial reefs are designed to become homes to a flourishing marine life”. Due to the mural being developed some time ago, and in addition to the mural being completed recently, the effects of the mural has grown in the most substantial ways. For example, becoming a new environment that can be man-made. HULA’s platform also increased, therefore his message of awareness for climate change and environmental reform will also increase as he continues. And the capability for the audience that HULA’s message via art, though temporary, will perpetually be remembered for advocacy.

Yoro founded an artist collective called Kapu Collective. One of their series is called "Undertones." The collective's goal is to "leave your mark on the world."

The “Undertones,” series features different body parts such as a hand or torsos which are painted against a wall along with an impasto style brush stroke. The composition of the body parts and the brushstroke gives the illusion of the brush stroke popping out and in the process of being grabbed by a hand or the brush stroke floating on top of a torso.

=== HUNA ===
In 2017, Sean Yoro, who goes by HULA, created one of his murals named Huna, which is Hawaiian for “hiding” in Saint John, Canada. HULA follows the meaning behind “hiding” and uses the change in 28 foot tides every few hours to his advantage. The mural shows a woman with her hands up that are laced in blue, with a peaceful expression; and as the tide changes, a different part of the woman emerges from the water, eventually revealing her entirety for a short period of time. According to HULA, ‘this piece was definitely challenging, but [his] appreciation for the ocean has taught [him] to work with the elements instead of fighting”. This project was a partnership with Discover Saint John and was covered highly by the media including shows such as CNN, CTV and CBC.

=== PROJECT A’O ‘ANA ===
Sean Yoro, also known as the artist HULA created the environmental art project A’O ‘Ana to raise awareness about climate change and rising sea levels. According to WIRED, he painted “large scale portraits on floating icebergs” in the arctic. To paint these, Yoro has to balance on a paddleboard and move between arctic ice floes. This exemplifies his dedication to spread work about protecting the environment whilst showcasing his art. According to the United Nations Climate Change (UNCC), Yoro's work was intended to “raise awareness on climate change through art.” In creating ephemeral portraits that will one day disappear, Yoro's art is made to both raise awareness and to emotionally connect viewers to thinking about the dangers of global warming. The Natural Resource Defense Council (NSDC) highlights how climate change can affect Indigenous communities. Critics and activists have described his murals as powerful examples of environmental art because nature itself became part of the artwork whilst simultaneously raising attention toward an important issue.

== Activism ==
Yoro mural called “Breath” portrays the importance of rising water levels due to rising temperatures of climate change which is a serious situation to many parts of the world. For instance, the Alaskan village of Shishmaref has had to relocate its people due to a large amount of land being sucked up by the risen ocean water. Sean Yoro created three murals from his series called “Deep Seads” to set a goal in the hopes that viewers can not only be impacted by the issues faced upon climate change but also to be a part of an action to go against climate change.

== Press ==
His work can be found on public walls and in galleries worldwide. He has caught the attention of major publications and media outlets such as CNN, The Huffington Post, Hypebeast, The Guardian, Juxtapoz Magazine, Daily Mail, NRDC, Aljazeera and Hi-Fructose Magazine. Yoro was recently awarded 'Forbes 30 under 30' in 2018.

With Yoro’s success and recognition, officials from the City of Saint John Canada invited Yoro in 2017 to paint a mural of a woman reaching out of the water in Pugsley Slip.

After the mural faded away, Yoro was invited again by the City of Saint John to paint another mural at the Market Slip. This time, the city provided the 28 by 40 foot wall aluminum canvas for Yoro to paint.

== Medium ==
HULA uses oil paints and mediums made with alkali-refined linseed oil or safflower oil and natural pigments. Yoro painted his murals with charcoal painting techniques which allowed the murals to have a contrast between dark and light tones that blended beautifully together. Yoro uses eco-friendly pigment sticks mixed with vegetable oil as a binder to substitute for acrylic-type mediums as safe and usable material.
