= Alexander Conze =

German archaeologist (1831–1914)

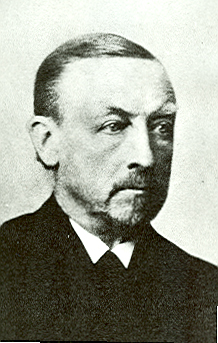
Alexander Conze 1831–1914)

Alexander Christian Leopold Conze (10 December 1831 – 19 July 1914) was a German archaeologist, who specialized in ancient Greek art.

He was a native of Hanover, and studied at the universities of Göttingen and Berlin. In 1855 he obtained his doctorate at Berlin as a student of Eduard Gerhard. In 1863 he became an associate professor at the University of Halle, and from 1869 to 1877, he served as a professor of archaeology at the University of Vienna. In the 1870s, he performed two archaeological explorations at Samothrace (1873 and 1875). In 1876, with Otto Hirschfeld, he organized the Archaeologic-Epigraphic Seminar at the university.

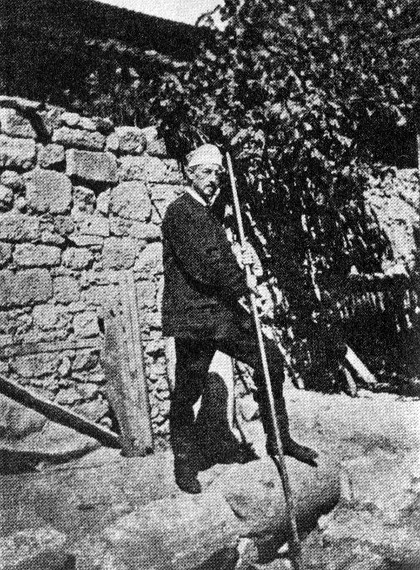
Alexander Conze at Samothrace

In 1877 he succeeded Karl Bötticher as director of the Berlin Antikensammlung (Collection of Classical Antiquities), In 1887, he became Secretariat of the German Archaeological Institute.

In 1878 with engineer Carl Humann, he began excavation at Pergamon in Asia Minor, a project that lasted until 1886. With Wilhelm Dörpfeld, he started a second archaeological dig at Pergamon in 1900. At Pergamon, Conze and Humann uncovered one of the greatest archaeological treasures of Hellenistic civilization, the Pergamon Altar, which today is housed at the Pergamon Museum in Berlin.

Conze died in Berlin.

== Honors ==
Two types of medals were struck for Alexander Conze during lifetime. The first was emitted when he left the University of Vienna in 1877. This piece has been made by famous Austrian engraver Josef Tautenhayn. The reverse shows an Athena Parthenos with a dedication in ancient Greek enclosed by a laurel wreath. The dedication names the memories and friendship that Conze will leave behind as reasons for commissioning this medal.

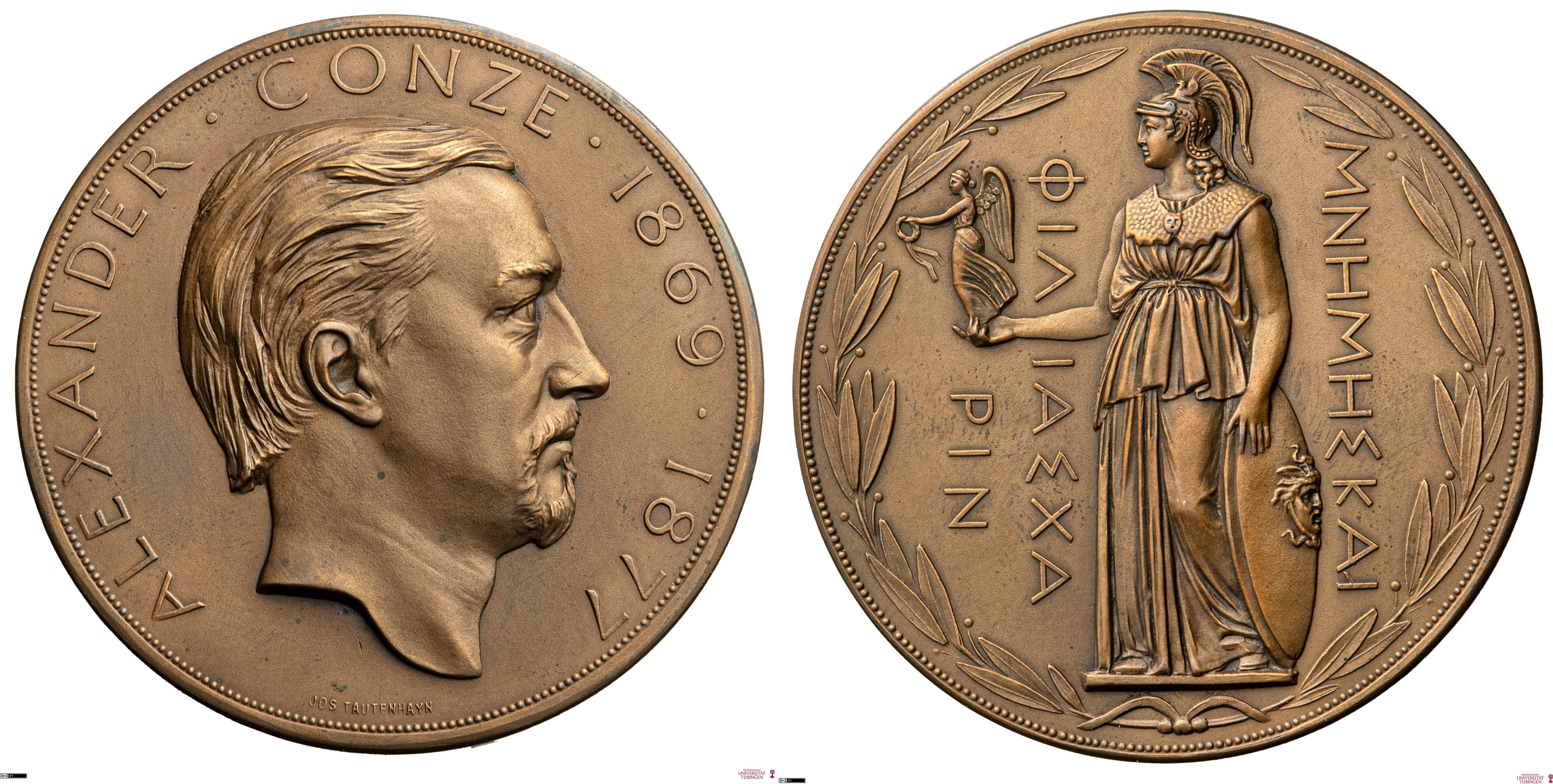
Medal Alexander Conze 1877

The second piece was made in 1905 by German artist and engraver Adolf Brütt when Conze retired from his position as secretary of the German Archaeological Institute.

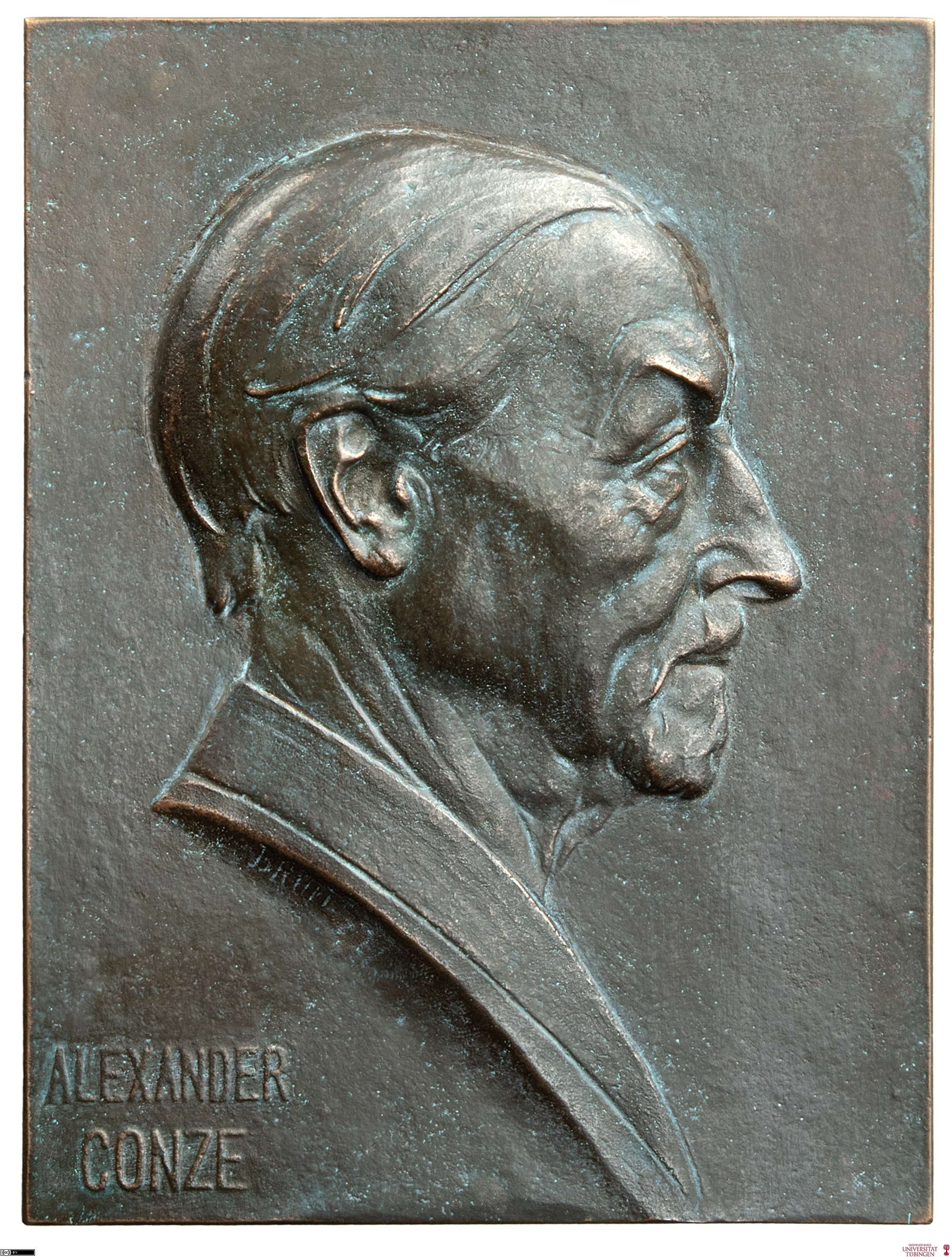
Medal Alexander Conze 1905

== Selected writings ==
- Reise auf den Inseln des thrakischen Meeres (Travel to the islands of the Thracian Sea, 1860.
- Reise auf der Insel Lesbos (Travel on the island of Lesbos), 1865.
- Die Bedeutung der klassischen Archäologie (The importance of classical archaeology). Wien 1869
- Zur Geschichte der Anfänge der griechischen Kunst (The history of the beginnings of Greek art). Wien 1870–1873.
- Heroen- und Göttergestalten der griechischen Künste (Heroes and "god-figures" in Greek art). Wien 1874.
- Römische Bildwerke einheimischer Fundorte in Österreich (Roman works locally discovered in Austria). Wien 1872–78.
- Archäologische Untersuchungen auf Samothrake; with Alois Hauser, George Niemann, Otto Benndorf (Archaeological investigations on Samothrace); 2 volumes, 1875–80.
- Über griechische Grabreliefs (On Greek grave reliefs), 1877.
- Die Ergebnisse der Ausgrabung zu Pergamon 1880-1881, (Results of the excavation at Pergamon in 1880–81), 1882.
