= Hula massacre =

War crime committed during the 1947–1949 Palestine war

Coordinates: 33°13′N 35°31′E

- Part of 1948 Arab–Israeli War, Operation Hiram
- Location: Hula, Lebanon
- Date: 31 October–1 November 1948
- Attack type: Massacre
- Deaths: 34–89 (Note: Saleh Abdel Jawad, 2007, Zionist Massacres: the Creation of the Palestinian Refugee Problem in the 1948 War. "89 men are killed.")
- Victim: Lebanese villagers
- Perpetrator: Israel Defense Forces: Shmuel Lahis

The Hula massacre took place between 31 October and 1 November 1948 in Hula, a village in Lebanon 3 km west of Kibbutz Manara, not far from the Litani River. It was captured on October 24 by the Carmeli Brigade of the Israel Defense Forces without any resistance. The women and children were expelled, most of the men aged between 15 and 60 were shot. In total between 35 and 58 men were executed in a house which was later blown up on top of them. 67 names of martyrs from the massacre appear on the monument in the village of Hula. One Israeli officer was tried and convicted by a military court and sentenced to seven years in prison, though this sentence was reduced to one year on appeal.

== Aftermath and legal proceedings ==
Two officers were held responsible for the massacre, and were reported as war criminals by their superior, Dov Yermiya. One of them, First Lieutenant Shmuel Lahis, who served as company commander, was tried for murder by an Israeli military court. At his trial, Lahis put forth the defence that the crime had been committed outside the borders of Israel. The military court rejected this defence but gave Lahis a postponement so that he could appeal this point to the High Court of Justice. In the same HCJ case, the Israeli government argued that the HCJ did not have the right to interpret military law. In February 1949, the HCJ rejected both the claim of Lahis and the claim of the government, allowing the trial to continue.

Lahis was found guilty and sentenced to 7 years in prison. His sentence was reduced to one year on appeal, and he was released from prison in 1950. Lahis received a retrospective presidential amnesty in 1955.

A February 26, 2026 investigation in Haaretz reported that, among the files released for publication and forming the basis of the investigation, the most significant concerned Shmuel Lahis. According to the report, Lahis personally killed dozens of residents of Hula, a village near Kibbutz Manara on the Lebanese side of the border. The article stated that he was the only soldier tried for the murder of Arabs during the 1948 war, following the insistence of battalion deputy commander Dov Yirmiyahu that he be prosecuted. Lahis reportedly argued that he had acted under orders and was sentenced to one year’s imprisonment; however, the report states that he did not serve a prison term, spent a short time at a military base, was pardoned shortly thereafter, and was later appointed director-general of the Jewish Agency.

=== Shmuel Lahis later life and controversy ===
Shmuel Lahis went on to become a lawyer and in 1978 became president of the Jewish Agency. Some Israelis opposed this appointment because of his involvement in the Hula massacre.

At the time of Lahis' nomination to head the Jewish Agency, Lahis's immediate superior in the Carmeli Brigade, Dov Yermiya, wrote to Jewish Agency Chairman Arie Dulzin about Lahis' role in the 1948 massacre. After Lahis' appointment in the role, the controversy was reported in the Israeli media and caused debate in the Knesset. Yermiya's letter was later published in the newspaper Al Hamishmar.

"I received a report that there had been no resistance in the village, that there was no enemy activity in the area, and that about a hundred people were left in the village. They had surrendered and requested to stay. The men among them were kept in one house under guard. I was brought there and saw about 35 men. [Yermiya does not remember the exact number today, and there were in fact over 50 men there] in the age range 15-60, including one Lebanese soldier in uniform [who was not killed].... When I returned to the village the following morning with an order to send the villagers away, I found out that, while I was away, two of the troops' officers had killed all of the captives who were in the house with a sub-machine gun, and had then blown up the house on top of them to be their grave. The women and children were sent west."

"When I asked him why he had done this, the officer answered that this was 'his revenge for the murder of his best friends in the Haifa Oil Refinery massacre.'" (Journal of Palestine Studies, vol. VII, no. 4 (summer 1978), no. 28, pp. 143-145)

Dulzin's response to Yermiya's letter said that Lahis' past had been known to the Jewish Agency since 1961. It also revealed that when Lahis had applied to be registered as a lawyer in 1955 the matter had been examined by the Israeli Legal Council. It was decided that the act which was the reason for Lahis' trial at the military courts was "not an act that carries with it a stigma" (quoted by Dulzin, as translated by JPS).

== Commemoration ==
During the 2024 Israeli invasion of Lebanon a memorial to the victims of the massacre was defaced by Israeli soldiers.

== See also ==
- Killings and massacres during the 1948 Palestine War
- List of massacres in Lebanon
- Plan Dalet
