= Wilhelm von Hartel =

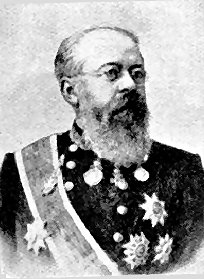

Wilhelm August Ritter von Hartel (28 May 1839 – 14 January 1907) was an Austrian philologist specializing in classical studies.

== Biography ==
He was born at Hof, in Moravia, and studied at the University of Vienna (1859–63). He was appointed professor of classical philology at Vienna in 1872, and made a member of the Vienna Academy in 1875. He became a member of the Berlin Academy in 1893, and became a life member of the Austrian House of Peers (German: Herrenhaus) in 1890. In 1899 he was for a short time Minister of Education and Public Worship (German: Minister für Kultus und Unterricht), to which post he was reappointed in 1900.

== Honors ==
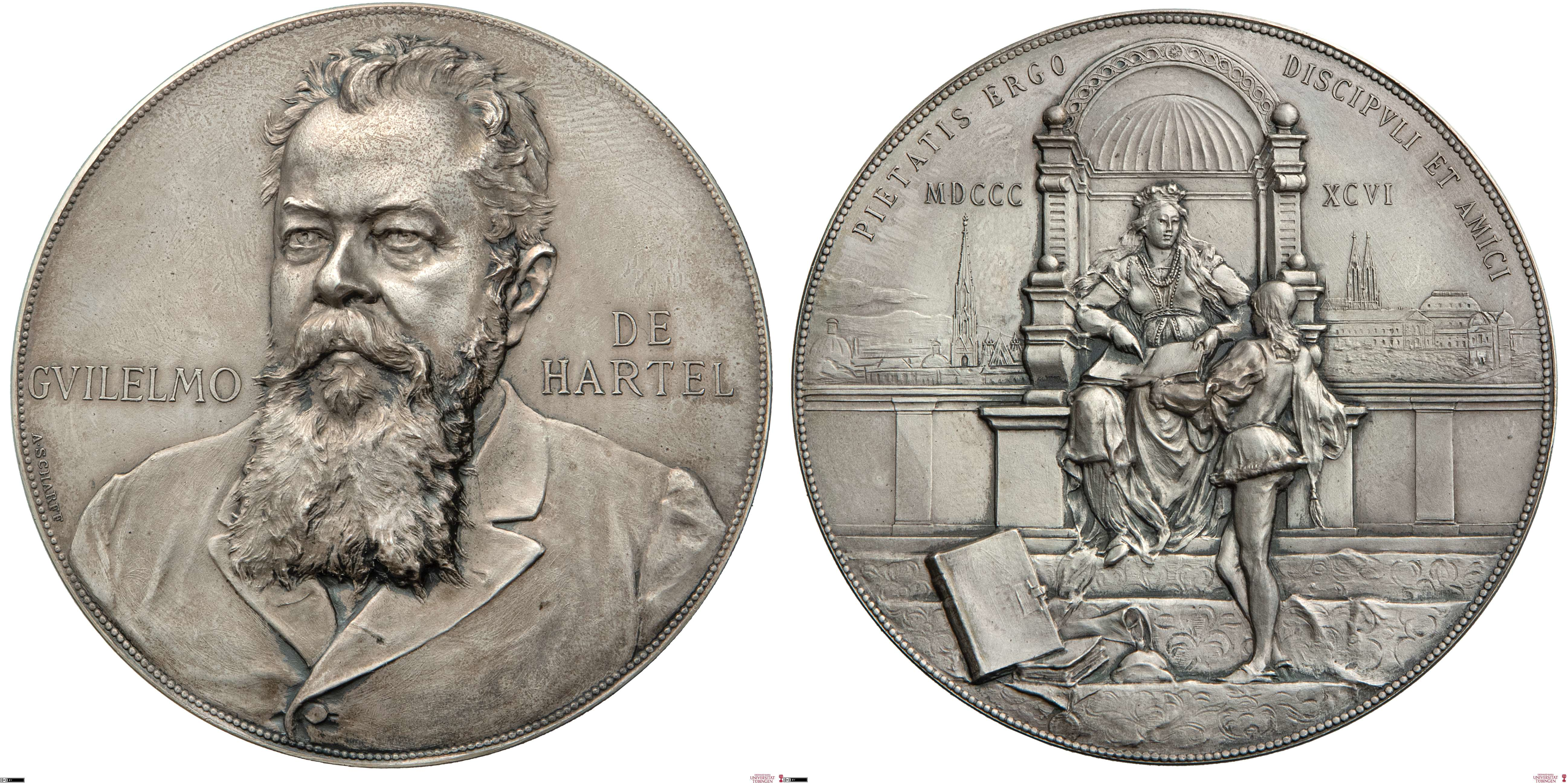
Medal Wilhelm von Hartel 1896 (silver, 58mm)

In occasion of his 30th anniversary of working at the University of Vienna friends and students dedicated a medal to Wilhelm von Hartel made by the local engraver Anton Scharff. Through Victor von Renner we know that the scene on the revers cites paintings of the Italian Renaissance painter Melozzo da Forlì picturing the passing down of knowledge. In the background the engraver Anton Scharff placed a panorama of Vienna thus combining his work in education and for the policy of education with the city where his merits were accomplished. Together with this medal Hartel received a marble bust made by Georg Leisek.

== Works ==
- Homerische Studien (1871–74; 2nd edition 1873).
- Demosthenische Studien (2 volumes, 1877–78).
- Studien über attisches Staatsrecht und Urkundenwesen (1878).

=== Editions of classical authors ===
For the Corpus Scriptorum Ecclesiasticorum Latinorum (Vienna Academy of Sciences):

- Eutropius, Breviarium ab urbe condita (1872).
- Cyprian, Opera omnia (3 volumes, 1868–71).
- Ennodius, Opera omnia (1882).
- Lucifer of Cagliari, Opuscula (1886).

He was made editor of the "Zeitschrift für Oesterreichische Gymnasien" in 1874. With Karl Schenkl, he founded the Wiener Studien, a journal on classical philology, in 1879.
