= Houla, Lebanon =

Houla حولا
- Municipality
- Location within Lebanon
- Coordinates: 33°12′36″N 35°31′01″E
- Grid position: 198/290 PAL
- Country: Lebanon
- Governorate: Nabatieh Governorate
- District: Marjayoun District
- Elevation: 900 m (3,000 ft)
- Highest elevation: 920 m (3,020 ft)
- Lowest elevation: 650 m (2,130 ft)
- Time zone: UTC+2 (EET)
  - Summer (DST): UTC+3 (EEST)
- Dialing code: +961-7

Houla (Arabic: حولا, romanized: Ḥūlā) is a municipality in Southern Lebanon, near the border with northern Israel, located on the southern side of the Litani river.

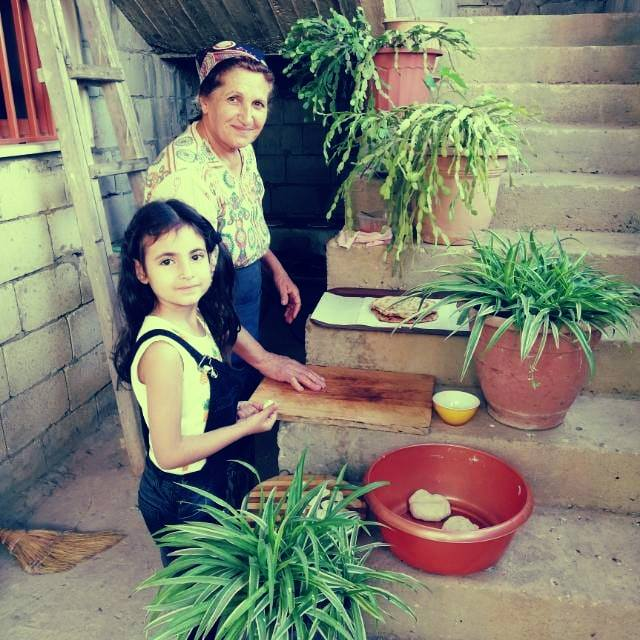
A resident baking bread

The village maintains its cultural traditions to the present day, and holds village festivals.

Houla, historically embedded in the Canaanite–Phoenician world associated with the Kingdom of Tyre. The area's antiquity is shown by discoveries of lintels and an olive-press. In the Ottoman era, Hula was a village inhabited by Shiites, described in 1881 as having stone buildings, cisterns, and a central mosque amidst olive and vineyards. During the 1948 Arab-Israeli war Israel army carried out the Hula massacre in the village, killing over 80 civilians of ages 15–60. Throughout subsequent conflicts, Hula suffered from military engagements and airstrikes.

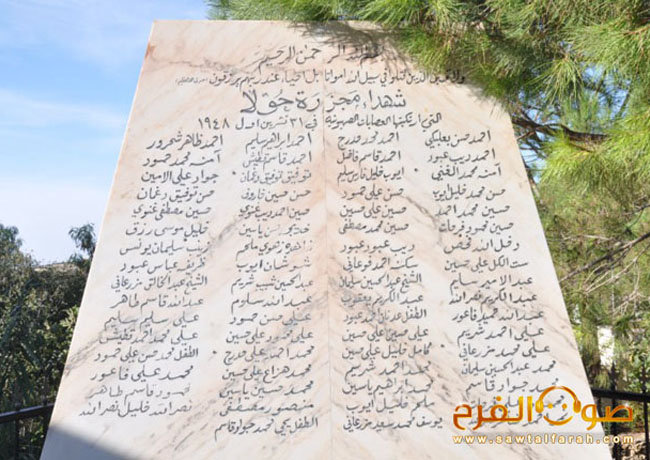
Plaque Commemorating Deaths from 1948 Hula Massacre

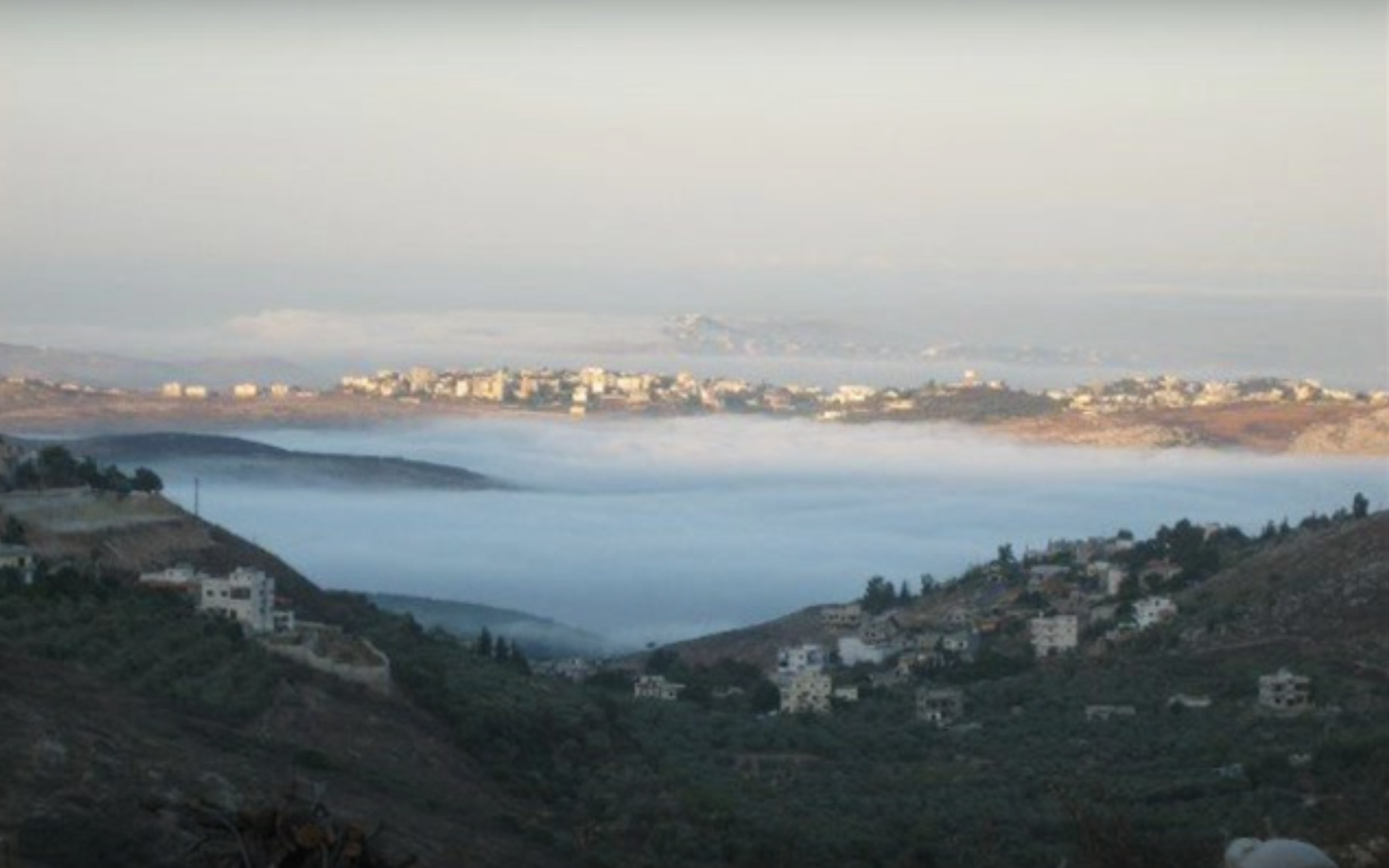
Clouds of Houla

== History ==
=== Ottoman period ===
In 1875 Victor Guérin explores the geographical location of Hula and other Southern villages of Lebanon bordering Palestine, and found that Hula had 300 Shia Muslim inhabitants.

In 1881, the PEF's Survey of Western Palestine (SWP) described it as: "A village, built of stone, containing about 500 Metawileh, one of the most prominent objects in which is a Sheikh's tomb. It is situated on the hill-top, and is surrounded by olives, vines, and arable land. There are several cisterns, two birkets (one rock-cut), and a spring." It also mentions that a small central mosque is situated on top of one of the hills in the village.

=== Modern era ===
On October 24, 1948, the city fell under Israeli occupation without resistance, children and women were expelled, and men aging from 15 to 60 were gathered in a house. On 1 November, the house was blown up with the prisoners still inside. This incident is known as the Hula massacre.

Following the 1982 invasion Hula became part of the Israeli Security Zone.

On 6 April 1992 an Israeli Army convoy was ambushed in Hula. Two soldiers were killed and 5 wounded. Islamic Jihad Organization, based in Baalbek, claimed responsibility. The target had been Major-General Yitzhak Mordechai, head of Israel's Northern Command. But he had left the convoy earlier. Three of the attackers were killed.

During the 2006 Israel-Lebanon conflict, on July 15, two young women were killed by an Israeli airstrike at the village. On August 7, 2006, an Israeli airstrike on Hula killed another civilian.

During the Israel–Lebanon border clashes, the IDF conducted a drone strike that destroyed a Hezbollah anti-tank guided missile squad in Houla after they launched a missile against the nearby Israeli community of Margaliot.

On 2 June 2024, two shepherds were killed in an Israeli airstrike on a house in the village.

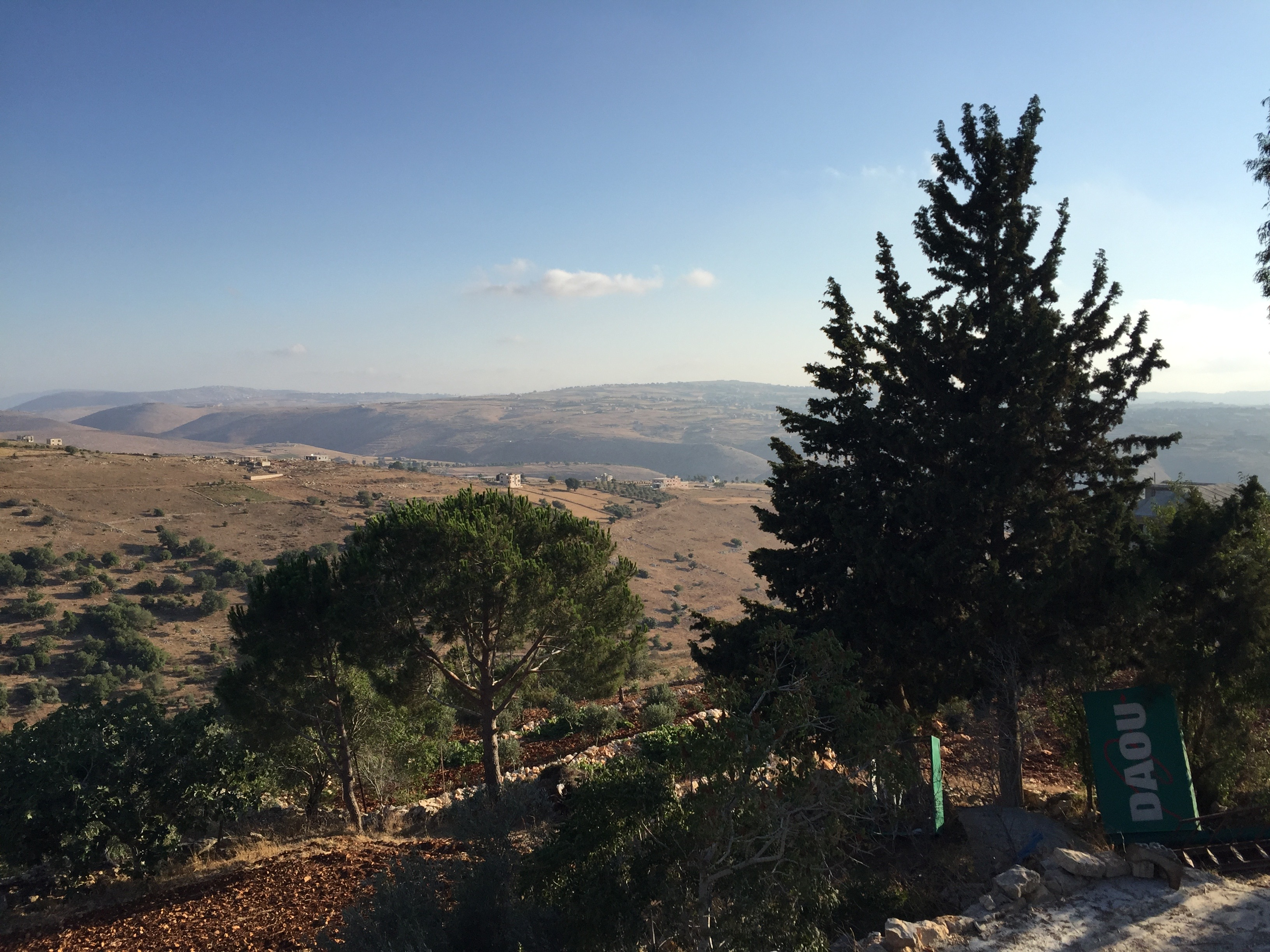

== Demographics ==
In 2014 Muslims made up 99.48% of registered voters in Houla. 98.74% of the voters were Shiite Muslims.

== Bibliography ==
- Conder, C.R.; Kitchener, H.H. (1881). The Survey of Western Palestine: Memoirs of the Topography, Orography, Hydrography, and Archaeology. Vol. 1. London: Committee of the Palestine Exploration Fund.
- Guérin, V. (1880). Description Géographique Historique et Archéologique de la Palestine (in French). Vol. 3: Galilee, pt. 2. Paris: L'Imprimerie Nationale.
- HRW (2007). Why They Died: Civilian Casualties in Lebanon During the 2006 War. Human Rights Watch.
- Palmer, E.H. (1881). The Survey of Western Palestine: Arabic and English Name Lists Collected During the Survey by Lieutenants Conder and Kitchener, R. E. Transliterated and Explained by E.H. Palmer. Committee of the Palestine Exploration Fund.

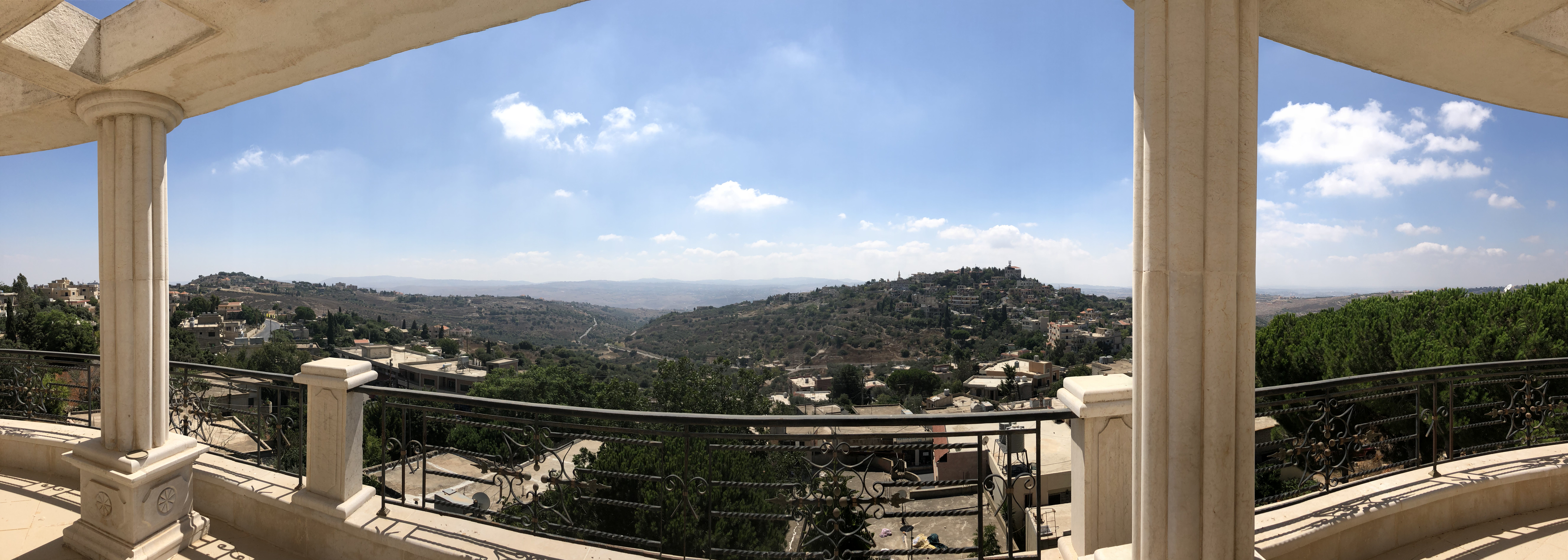
