= Corpus Scriptorum Ecclesiasticorum Latinorum =

The Corpus Scriptorum Ecclesiasticorum Latinorum (CSEL) is an academic series that publishes critical editions of Latin works by late-antique Christian authors. There are about 100 volumes in the series; many are considered authoritative standard editions.

== Description ==
The CSEL publishes Latin writings of Christian authors from the time of the late 2nd century (Tertullian) until the beginning of the 8th century (Bede the Venerable, †735). Each text is edited on the basis of all (or the most important of all) the extant manuscripts according to modern editorial techniques, in order to produce a text as close as possible to the original. Each volume includes an introduction, in which the principles of the preparation of the text are explained. Some editions are prepared by the staff of the CSEL, others by external, internationally renowned experts; the volumes are published after a positive evaluation by an international advisory board: De Gruyter (prior to 2012: Verlag der Österreichischen Akademie der Wissenschaften). The CSEL also runs the online database Edenda, where CSEL editions as well as editing projects by others are publicly announced. In addition, the CSEL publishes special catalogues for the large extant corpus of medieval manuscripts containing works of Augustine or ascribed to him ("Die handschriftliche Überlieferung der Werke des heiligen Augustinus"), in order to make time-consuming research in this field easier. In addition, monographs on topics related to the Latin patristic period and conference proceedings are published at irregular intervals ("CSEL Extra seriem").

== History ==
The CSEL was founded in 1864 by the Imperial Academy of Sciences in Vienna (Österreichische Akademie der Wissenschaften) in order to produce critical editions of Latin patristic texts – editions that were meant to facilitate the lexicographical work of the Thesaurus linguae Latinae (at that time still in the planning stages). Before the year 2012 the CSEL was edited by the “Kommission zur Herausgabe des Corpus der lateinischen Kirchenväter” (“Kirchenväterkommission”) of the Austrian Academy of Sciences. The chairmen of this commission were:

- 1864–1874: Johannes Vahlen
- 1875–1891: Franz von Miklosich
- 1891–1907: Wilhelm von Hartel
- 1907–1916: Wilhelm Meyer-Lübke
- 1916–1941: Edmund Hauler
- 1941–1963: Richard Meister
- 1964–1982: Rudolf Hanslik
- 1982–1991: Herbert Hunger
- 1991–2001: Adolf Primmer
- 2001–2012: Kurt Smolak

After the commission was transferred to the University of Salzburg in 2012, the CSEL became part of the Department of Ancient Studies / Latin at the University of Salzburg.

== List of Volumes ==
- Sulpicius Severus, Opera - ed. K. Halm 1866; Pseudo-Sulpicius Severus, Epistulae - ed. K. Halm 1866, CSEL 1
- Minucius Felix, Octavius. Firmicus Maternus, De errore profanarum religionum - ed. K. Halm 1867, CSEL 2
- Cyprianus, Opera omnia (pars 1): Ad Donatum, Quod idola dii non sint, Ad Quirinum (testimoniorum libri tres), De habitu virginum, De catholicae ecclesiae unitate, De lapsis, De dominica oratione, De mortalitate, Ad Fortunatum (De exhortatione martyrii), Ad Demetrianum, De opere et eleemosynis, De bono patientiae, De zelo et livore, Sententiae episcoporum numero LXXXVII (De haereticis baptizandis) - ed. W. Hartel 1868, CSEL 3/1
- Cyprianus, Opera omnia (pars 2): Epistulae - ed. W. Hartel 1871, CSEL 3/2
- Cyprianus (Pseudo-Cyprianus), Opera omnia (pars 3): Opera spuria. Indices. Praefatio - ed. W. Hartel 1871, CSEL 3/3
- Arnobius, Adversus nationes - ed. A. Reifferscheid 1875, CSEL 4
- Orosius, Historiarum adversum paganos libri septem, Liber apologeticus - ed. K. Zangemeister 1882, CSEL 5
- Ennodius, Opera omnia - ed. W. Hartel 1882, CSEL 6
- Victor Vitensis, Historia persecutionis Africanae provinciae. Pseudo-Victor Vitensis, Passio septem monachorum, Notitia provinciarum et civitatum Africae - ed. M. Petschenig 1881, CSEL 7
- Salvianus Massiliensis, Opera omnia - ed. F. Pauly 1883, CSEL 8
- Eugippius, Excerpta ex operibus Augustini - ed. P. Knöll 1885, CSEL 9/1
- Eugippius, Vita sancti Severini - ed. P. Knöll 1886, CSEL 9/2
- Sedulius, Opera omnia - ed. J. Huemer 1885, CSEL 10
- Sedulius, Opera omnia - ed. J. Huemer, editio altera supplementis aucta curante V. Panagl 2007, CSEL 10
- Claudianus Mamertus, Opera - ed. A. Engelbrecht 1885, CSEL 11
- Augustinus, Speculum. Pseudo-Augustinus, Liber de divinis scripturis - ed. F. Weihrich 1887, CSEL 12
- Cassianus, Conlationes - ed. M. Petschenig 1886, CSEL 13
- Cassianus, Conlationes - ed. M. Petschenig, editio altera supplementis aucta curante G. Kreuz 2004, CSEL 13
- Lucifer Calaritanus, Opuscula - ed. W. Hartel 1886, CSEL 14
- Commodianus, Carmina - ed. B. Dombart 1887, CSEL 15
- Poetae Christiani minores: Paulinus Perticordiae, Carmina - ed. M. Petschenig / Orientius, Carmina - ed. R. Ellis / Paulinus Pellaeus, Eucharisticos - ed. G. Brandes / Claudius Marius Victor, Alethia. Proba, Cento - ed. K. Schenkl 1888, CSEL 16/1
- Cassianus, De institutis coenobiorum, De incarnatione domini contra Nestorium - ed. M. Petschenig 1888, CSEL 17
- Cassianus, De institutione coenobiorum, De incarnatione contra Nestorium - ed. M. Petschenig, editio altera supplementis aucta cur. G. Kreuz 2004, CSEL 17
- Priscillianus, Opera. Orosius, Commonitorium de errore Priscillianistarum et Origenistarum - ed. G. Schepss 1889, CSEL 18
- Lactantius, Divinae institutiones et Epitome divinarum institutionum - S. Brandt 1890, CSEL 19
- Tertullianus, De spectaculis, De idololatria, Ad nationes, De testimonio animae, Scorpiace, De oratione, De baptismo, De pudicitia, De ieiunio adversus psychicos, De anima - ed. A. Reifferscheid, G. Wissowa 1890, CSEL 20
- Faustus Reiensis, De gratia libri duo, De spiritu sancto libri duo, Epistulae, Sermones. Ruricius, Epistularum libri duo - ed. A. Engelbrecht 1891, CSEL 21
- Hilarius, Tractatus super psalmos - ed. A. Zingerle 1891, CSEL 22
- Cyprianus Gallus, Heptateuchos, accedunt incertorum De Sodoma et Iona et ad senatorem carmina et Hilarii quae feruntur in Genesin, de Maccabeis atque de Evangelio - ed. R. Peiper 1891, CSEL 23
- Iuvencus, Evangeliorum libri quattuor - ed. J. Huemer 1891, CSEL 24
- Augustinus, De utilitate credendi, De duabus animabus, Contra Fortunatum Manichaeum, Contra Adimantum, Contra epistulam fundamenti, Contra Faustum Manichaeum - ed. J. Zycha 1891, CSEL 25/1
- Augustinus, Contra Felicem Manichaeum, De natura boni, Epistula Secundini, Contra Secundinum Manichaeum. Euodius, De fide contra Manichaeos. Pseudo-Augustinus, Commonitorium quomodo sit agendum cum Manichaeis - ed. J. Zycha 1892, CSEL 25/2
- Optatus Milevitanus, Contra Parmenianum Donatistam, Appendix decem monumentorum veterum - ed. K. Ziwsa 1893, CSEL 26
- Lactantius, De opificio dei, De ira dei, Carmina, Fragmenta - ed. S. Brandt 1893, CSEL 27/1
- Lactantius, De mortibus persecutorum - ed. S. Brandt, G. Laubmann 1897, CSEL 27/2
- Augustinus, De Genesi ad litteram, De Genesi ad litteram liber imperfectus, Locutiones in Heptateuchum - ed. J. Zycha 1894, CSEL 28/1
- Augustinus, Quaestiones in Heptateuchum, Adnotationes in Iob - ed. J. Zycha 1895, CSEL 28/2
- Paulinus Nolanus, Epistulae - ed. W. Hartel 1894, CSEL 29
- Paulinus Nolanus, Epistulae - ed. W. Hartel, editio altera supplementis aucta curante M. Kamptner 1999, CSEL 29
- Paulinus Nolanus, Carmina - ed. W. Hartel 1894, CSEL 30
- Paulinus Nolanus, Carmina - ed. W. Hartel, editio altera supplementis aucta curante M. Kamptner 1999, CSEL 30
- Eucherius, Formulae spiritalis intellegentiae, Instructionum libri duo, Passio Agaunensium martyrum, Epistula de laude Heremi, accedunt Epistulae ab Salviano et Hilario et Rustico ad Eucherium datae - ed. K. Wotke 1894, CSEL 31
- Ambrosius, Exameron, De paradiso, De Cain et Abel, De Noe, De Abraham, De Isaac, De bono mortis - ed. K. Schenkl 1896/1897, CSEL 32/1
- Ambrosius, De Iacob, De Ioseph, De patriarchis, De fuga saeculi, De interpellatione Iob et David, De apologia David, Apologia David altera, De Helia et ieiunio, De Nabuthae, De Tobia - ed. K. Schenkl 1897, CSEL 32/2
- Ambrosius, Expositio evangelii secundum Lucan - ed. K. Schenkl 1902, CSEL 32/4
- Augustinus, Confessiones - ed. P. Knöll 1896, CSEL 33
- Augustinus, Epistulae (ep. 1-30) - ed. A. Goldbacher 1895, CSEL 34/1
- Augustinus, Epistulae (ep. 31-123) - ed. A. Goldbacher 1898, CSEL 34/2
- Epistulae imperatorum pontificum aliorum inde ab a. CCCLXVII usque ad a. DLIII datae Avellana quae dicitur collectio, pars I: ep. 1-104 - ed. O. Guenther 1895, CSEL 35/1
- Epistulae imperatorum pontificum aliorum inde ab a. CCCLXVII usque ad a. DLIII datae Avellana quae dicitur collectio, pars II: ep. 105-244 - ed. O. Guenther 1898, CSEL 35/2
- Augustinus, Retractationes - ed. P. Knöll 1902, CSEL 36
- Flavius Iosephus, Contra Apionem - ed. K. Boysen 1898, CSEL 37
- Filastrius Brixiensis, Diversarum hereseon liber - ed. F. Marx 1898, CSEL 38
- Itinera Hierosolymitana - ed. P. Geyer 1898, CSEL 39
- Augustinus, De civitate dei (pars 1: lib. 1-13) - ed. E. Hoffmann 1899, CSEL 40/1
- Augustinus, De civitate dei (pars 2: lib. 14-22) - ed. E. Hoffmann 1900, CSEL 40/2
- Augustinus, De fide et symbolo, De fide et operibus, De agone christiano, De continentia, De bono coniugali, De sancta virginitate, De bono viduitatis, De adulterinis coniugiis, De mendacio, Contra mendacium, De opere monachorum, De divinatione daemonum, De cura pro mortuis gerenda, De patientia - ed. J. Zycha 1900, CSEL 41
- Augustinus, De perfectione iustitiae hominis, De gestis Pelagii, De gratia Christi, De nuptiis et concupiscentia - ed. K. F. Vrba, J. Zycha 1902, CSEL 42
- Augustinus, De consensu evangelistarum libri quattuor - ed. F. Weihrich 1904, CSEL 43
- Augustinus, Epistulae (ep. 124-184 A) - ed. A. Goldbacher 1904, CSEL 44
- Evagrius, Altercatio legis inter Simonem Iudaeum et Theophilum Christianum - ed. E. Bratke 1904, CSEL 45
- Tyrannius Rufinus, Orationum Gregorii Nazianzeni novem interpretatio - J. Wrobelii copiis usus edidit et prolegomena indicesque adiecit A. Engelbrecht 1910, CSEL 46
- Tertullianus, De patientia, De carnis resurrectione, Adversus Hermogenem, Adversus Valentinianos, Adversus omnes haereses, Adversus Praxean, Adversus Marcionem - ed. E. Kroymann 1906, CSEL 47
- Boethius, In Isagogen Porphyrii commenta - copiis G. Schepss comparatis suisque usus ed. S. Brandt 1906, CSEL 48
- Victorinus Petavionensis, Opera - ed. J. Haussleiter 1916, CSEL 49
- Pseudo-Augustinus, Quaestiones veteris et novi testamenti CXXVII, accedit appendix continens alterius editionis quaestiones selectas - ed. A. Souter 1908, CSEL 50
- Augustinus, Psalmus contra partem Donati, Contra epistulam Parmeniani, De baptismo - ed. M. Petschenig 1908, CSEL 51
- Augustinus, Contra litteras Petiliani, Epistula ad catholicos de secta Donatistarum, Contra Cresconium - ed. M. Petschenig 1909, CSEL 52
- Augustinus, De unico baptismo, Breviculus collationis cum Donatistis, Contra partem Donati post gesta, Sermo ad Caesariensis ecclesiae plebem, Gesta cum Emerito Donatistarum episcopo, Contra Gaudentium Donatistarum episcopum. Accedit Sententia concilii Bagaiensis. Pseudo-Augustinus, Sermo de Rusticiano subdiacono, Adversus Fulgentium Donatistam - ed. M. Petschenig 1910, CSEL 53
- Hieronymus, Epistulae 1-70 - ed. I. Hilberg 1910, CSEL 54
- Hieronymus, Epistulae 1-70 - ed. I. Hilberg, editio altera supplementis aucta curante M. Kamptner 1996, CSEL 54
- Hieronymus, Epistulae 71-120 - ed. I. Hilberg 1912, CSEL 55
- Hieronymus, Epistulae 71-120 - ed. I. Hilberg, editio altera supplementis aucta curante M. Kamptner 1996, CSEL 55
- Hieronymus, Epistulae 121-154 - ed. I. Hilberg 1918, CSEL 56
- Hieronymus, Epistulae 121-154 - ed. I. Hilberg, editio altera supplementis aucta curante M. Kamptner 1996, CSEL 56/1
- Hieronymus, Epistularum Indices et Addenda - comp. M. Kamptner 1996, CSEL 56/2
- Augustinus, Epistulae (ep. 185-270) - ed. A. Goldbacher 1911, CSEL 57
- Augustinus, Epistulae: Praefatio editoris et indices - ed. A. Goldbacher 1923, CSEL 58
- Hieronymus, In Hieremiam prophetam libri sex - ed. S. Reiter 1913, CSEL 59
- Augustinus, De peccatorum meritis et remissione et de baptismo parvulorum, De spiritu et littera, De natura et gratia, De natura et origine animae, Contra duas epistulas Pelagianorum - ed. K. F. Vrba et J. Zycha 1913, CSEL 60
- Prudentius, Carmina - ed. J. Bergman 1926, CSEL 61
- Ambrosius, Expositio psalmi CXVIII - ed. M. Petschenig 1913, CSEL 62
- Ambrosius, Expositio psalmi CXVIII - ed. M. Petschenig, editio altera supplementis aucta cur. M. Zelzer 1999, CSEL 62
- Augustinus, Contra Academicos, De beata vita, De ordine - ed. P. Knöll 1922, CSEL 63
- Ambrosius, Explanatio psalmorum XII - ed. M. Petschenig 1919, CSEL 64
- Ambrosius, Explanatio psalmorum XII - ed. M. Petschenig, editio altera supplementis aucta cur. M. Zelzer 1999, CSEL 64
- Hilarius Pictaviensis, Tractatus mysteriorum, Collectanea antiariana, Ad Constantium imperatorem, Hymni, Fragmenta. Pseudo-Hilarius, Epistula ad Abram filiam, Hymni - ed. A. Feder 1916, CSEL 65
- Hegesippus, Historiae libri V - ed. V. Ussani 1932, CSEL 66/1
- Hegesippus, Historiae libri V. Praefatio et Indices - ed. V. Ussani, praef. K. Mras 1960, CSEL 66/2
- Boethius, De consolatione philosophiae - R. Peiperi atque G. Schepssii copiis et A. Engelbrechtii studiis usus ed. W. Weinberger 1934, CSEL 67
- Gaudentius Brixiensis, Tractatus - ed. A. Glück 1936, CSEL 68
- Tertullianus, Apologeticum - ed. H. Hoppe 1939, CSEL 69
- Tertullianus, De praescriptione haereticorum, De cultu feminarum, Ad uxorem, De exhortatione castitatis, De corona, De carne Christi, Adversus Iudaeos - ed. E. Kroymann 1942, CSEL 70
- Cassiodorus - Epiphanius, Historia ecclesiastica tripartita - rec. W. Jacob, ed. cur. R. Hanslik 1952, CSEL 71
- Arator, De actibus apostolorum - ed. A. P. McKinlay 1951, CSEL 72
- Ambrosius, Explanatio symboli, De sacramentis, De mysteriis, De paentientia, De excessu fratris, De obitu Valentiniani, De obitu Theodosii - ed. O. Faller 1955, CSEL 73
- Augustinus, De libero arbitrio libri tres - ed. W. M. Green 1956, CSEL 74
- Benedicti Regula - ed. R. Hanslik 1960, CSEL 75
- Benedicti Regula - ed. R. Hanslik 1977, CSEL 75
- Tertullianus, Ad martyras, Ad Scapulam, De fuga in persecutione, De monogamia, De virginibus velandis, De pallio - opera E. Kroymann usus ed. V. Bulhart / Tertullianus, De paenitentia - ed. Ph. Borleffs 1957, CSEL 76
- Augustinus, De magistro, De vera religione - ed. G. Weigel 1961, CSEL 77
- Ambrosius, De fide - ed. O. Faller 1962, CSEL 78
- Ambrosius, De spiritu sancto libri tres, De incarnationis dominicae sacramento - ed. O. Faller 1964, CSEL 79
- Augustinus, De doctrina christiana - ed. W. M. Green 1963, CSEL 80
- Ambrosiaster, Commentarius in epistulas Paulinas (ad Romanos) - ed. H. J. Vogels 1966, CSEL 81/1
- Ambrosiaster, Commentarius in epistulas Paulinas (ad Corinthios) - ed. H. J. Vogels 1968, CSEL 81/2
- Ambrosiaster, Commentarius in epistulas Paulinas (ad Galatas, ad Efesios, ad Filippenses, ad Colosenses, ad Thesalonicenses, ad Timotheum, ad Titum, ad Filemonem) - ed. H. J. Vogels 1969, CSEL 81/3
- Ambrosius, Epistulae et acta, epistularum libri I-VI - ed. O. Faller 1968, CSEL 82/1
- Ambrosius, Epistulae et acta: Epistularum libri VII-VIIII - post O. Faller rec. M. Zelzer 1990, CSEL 82/2
- Ambrosius, Epistularum liber decimus, Epistulae extra collectionem, Gesta concili Aquileiensis - ed. M. Zelzer 1982, CSEL 82/3
- Ambrosius. Epistulae et acta: Indices et Addenda - comp. M. Zelzer, adiuvante L. Krestan 1996, CSEL 82/4
- Marius Victorinus, Ad Candidum Arrianum, Adversus Arium, De homoousio recipiendo, Hymni - ed. P. Henry, P. Hadot 1971, CSEL 83/1
- Marius Victorinus, In epistulam Pauli ad Ephesios, In epistulam Pauli ad Galatas, In epistulam Pauli ad Philippenses - ed. F. Gori 1986, CSEL 83/2
- Augustinus, Expositio quarumdam propositionum ex epistula ad Romanos, Epistulae ad Galatas expositio, Epistulae ad Romanos inchoata expositio - ed. J. Divjak 1971, CSEL 84
- Augustinus, Contra Iulianum opus imperfectum (libri 1-3) - post E. Kalinka ed. M. Zelzer 1974, CSEL 85/1
- Augustinus, Contra Iulianum opus imperfectum (libri 4-6) - ed. M. Zelzer 2004, CSEL 85/2
- Basili Regula a Rufino latine versa - ed. K. Zelzer 1986, CSEL 86
- Eugippii Regula - ed. F. Villegas, A. De Vogüé 1976, CSEL 87
- Augustinus, Epistolae ex duobus codicibus nuper in lucem prolatae - ed. J. Divjak 1981, CSEL 88
- Augustinus, Soliloquiorum libri duo, De inmortalitate animae, De quantitate animae - ed. W. Hörmann 1986, CSEL 89
- Augustinus, De moribus ecclesiae catholicae et de moribus Manichaeorum libri duo - ed. J. B. Bauer 1992, CSEL 90
- Augustinus, De Genesi contra Manichaeos - ed. D. Weber 1998, CSEL 91
- Augustinus, Contra sermonem Arrianorum praecedit sermo Arrianorum - ed. M. J. Suda / Augustinus, De correptione et gratia - ed. G. Folliet 2000, CSEL 92
- Augustinus, Enarrationes in Psalmos 1-32 (expos.) - ed. C. Weidmann 2003, CSEL 93/1A
- Augustinus, Enarrationes in Psalmos 18-32 (Sermones) - ed. C. Weidmann 2011, CSEL 93/1B
- Augustinus, Enarrationes in Psalmos 51-60 - ed. H. Müller 2004, CSEL 94/1
- Augustine, Enarrationes in Psalmos 61-70 - ed. H. Müller 2020, CSEL 94/2
- Augustinus, Enarrationes in Psalmos 18-32 (Sermones) - ed. C. Weidmann 2011, CSEL 93/1B
- Augustinus, Enarrationes in Psalmos 101-109 - ed. F. Gori adiuvante C. Pierantoni 2011, CSEL 95/1
- Augustinus, Enarrationes in Psalmos 110-118 - ed. F. Gori adiuvante A. De Nicola 2015, CSEL 95/2
- Augustinus, Enarrationes in Psalmos 119-133 - ed. F. Gori 2001, CSEL 95/3
- Augustinus, Enarrationes in Psalmos 134-140 - ed. F. Gori adiuvante F. Recanatini 2002, CSEL 95/4
- Augustinus, Enarrationes in Psalmos 141-150 - ed. F. Gori adiuvante I. Spaccia 2005, CSEL 95/5
- Anonymi in Iob commentarius - ed. K. B. Steinhauser, adiuvantibus H. Müller et D. Weber 2006, CSEL 96
- Prosper, De vocatione omnium gentium - ed. R. J. Teske, D. Weber 2009, CSEL 97
- Monastica 1: Donati Regula, Pseudo-Columbani Regula monialium (frg.) - ed. V. Zimmerl-Panagl, Edition der Regula Donati nach Vorarbeiten von M. Zelzer 2015, CSEL 98
- Pseudo-Augustinus, De oratione et elemosina, De sobrietate et castitate, De incarnatione et deitate Christi ad Ianuarium, Dialogus quaestionum - ed. L. J. Dorfbauer 2011, CSEL 99
- Prosper, Liber Epigrammatum - ed. A. G. A. Horsting 2016, CSEL 100
- Augustinus, Sermones selecti - ed. C. Weidmann 2015, CSEL 101
- Augustinus, De musica - ed. M. Jacobsson, Introduction by M. Jacobsson and L. J. Dorfbauer 2017, CSEL 102
- Fortunatianus Aquileiensis, Commentarii in evangelia - ed. L. J. Dorfbauer 2017, CSEL 103
- Collatio Carthaginensis anni 411: Gesta collationis Carthaginensis; Augustinus, Breviculus collationis; Augustinus, Ad Donatistas post collationem - ed. C. Weidmann 2018, CSEL 104
- Augustinus, Späte Schriften zur Gnadenlehre, De gratia et libero arbitrio, De praedestinatione sanctorum libri duo (olim: De praedestinatione sanctorum, De dono perseverantiae) - ed. by V. H. Drecoll and C. Scheerer in cooperation with B. Gleede, 2019, CSEL 105
- Ambrosius Mediolanensis, Orationes funebres I: In psalmum 61/De obitu Gratiani, De consolatione Valentiniani/De obitu Valentiniani, De obitu Theodosii - ed. V. Zimmerl-Panagl, Berlin u.a. 2021, CSEL 106
- Ambrosius Mediolanensis, Orationes funebres II: De excessu fratris libri II - ed. V. Zimmerl-Panagl, Berlin u.a. 2022, CSEL 107

== Evaluation ==
The series currently consists of about 100 volumes, some with multiple sub-volumes. These volumes have replaced about a third of J. P. Migne's Patrologia Latina, which do not offer critical editions. Some CSEL volumes have themselves been replaced by more recent critical editions (e.g., Corpus Christianorum Series Latina, Sources chrétiennes, Bibliothèque augustinienne), but about two-thirds of them are still considered authoritative standard editions; in fact, the CSEL edition often remains the only critical edition of a given text. In the course of work on the manuscript catalogues as well as on the preparation of CSEL editions, patristic texts which were previously thought lost have been recovered: e.g., the writings of the Spanish heretic Priscillian, the commentary on Revelation by Victorinus of Pettau, 29 unknown letters of Augustine ("Epistulae Divjak"), six of Augustine's sermons ("Sermones Erfurt"), and the full text of the commentary on the gospels by Fortunatianus of Aquileia (mid-4th century; edition published 2017). Numerous volumes of the CSEL were incorporated into the digital Library of Latin Texts (LLT).

== Literature ==
- Rudolf Hanslik, 100 Jahre Corpus Scriptorum Ecclesiasticorum Latinorum, in: Anzeiger der philosophisch-historischen Klasse der Österreichischen Akademie der Wissenschaften 101 (1964), 21–35.
- Michaela Zelzer, Ein Jahrhundert (und mehr) CSEL. Evaluation von Ziel und Veröffentlichungen, Sacris Erudiri 38 (1998), 75–99.
- Dorothea Weber, 150 Jahre Corpus Scriptorum Ecclesiasticorum Latinorum, in: Edition und Erforschung lateinischer patristischer Texte. 150 Jahre CSEL (FS Kurt Smolak), herausgegeben von Victoria Zimmerl-Panagl, Lukas J. Dorfbauer, Clemens Weidmann, Berlin 2014, IX-XI.
