= Otto Benndorf =

German-Austrian archaeologist (1838-1907)

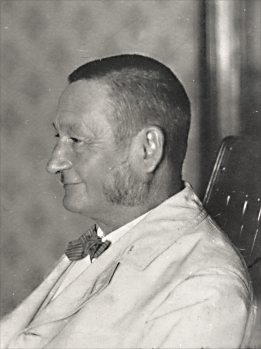
Otto Benndorf (1838-1907)

Otto Benndorf (13 September 1838 – 2 January 1907) was a German-Austrian archaeologist who was a native of Greiz, Principality of Reuss-Greiz. He was the father of physicist Hans Benndorf (1870–1953).

== Life and career ==
He studied under Friedrich Gottlieb Welcker (1784–1868), Otto Jahn (1813–1869) and Friedrich Ritschl (1806–1876) at the University of Bonn. Later, he worked as an instructor at Schulpforta, where one of his students was Friedrich Nietzsche. From 1864 to 1868, he was a member of a scientific expedition that toured Italy (Rome), Sicily, Greece and Asia Minor. In 1868, he obtained his habilitation at the University of Göttingen under the guidance of Friedrich Wieseler (1811–1892).

In 1869, he became an associate professor of archaeology at the University of Zurich, relocating to the Ludwig-Maximilians-Universität München in 1871 and to Prague the following year. With Alexander Conze (1831–1914), he took part in the second Austrian archaeological expedition to Samothrace (1875). Two years later, he succeeded Conze as chair of archaeology at the University of Vienna. Among his students at Vienna were Michael Rostovtzeff (1870–1952), Emil Szántó (1857–1904), Julius von Schlosser (1866–1938) and Franz Studniczka (1860–1929).

From 1881 to 82, he excavated the so-called "Heroon of Trysa" in Lycia, shipping more than 100 boxes of material to the Kunsthistorisches Museum in Vienna. With Carl Humann, he organized an excavation of Ephesus (1895). In 1898, he founded the Österreichisches Archäologische Institut (Austrian Archaeological Institute at Athens), serving as its director until his death in 1907.
