= Antiphellus =

Ancient Greek city in Anatolia

Coordinates: 36°12′07″N 29°38′17″E

- Antifellos (Turkish); Ἀντίφελλος (Ancient Greek)
- Interactive map of Antiphellus
- Type: Settlement
- Location: Kaş, Antalya Province, Turkey
- Region: Lycia

Site notes
- Archaeologists: Charles Fellows
- Condition: Ruined, now mostly built on by the modern town

Antiphellus or Antiphellos (Turkish: Antifellos, Ancient Greek: Ἀντίφελλος), known originally as Habesos, was an ancient coastal city in Lycia. The earliest occurrence of its Greek name is on a 4th-century-BCE inscription. Initially settled by the Lycians, the city was occupied by the Persians during the 6th century BCE. It rose in importance under the Greeks, when it served as the port of the nearby inland city of Phellus, but once Phellus started to decline in importance, Antiphellus became the region's largest city, with the ability to mint its own coins. During the Roman period, Antiphellus received funds from the civic benefactor Opramoas of Rhodiapolis that may have been used to help rebuild the city following the earthquake that devastated the region in 141.

The Irish naval officer Sir Francis Beaufort discovered the site of the city in the 1820s, when it was deserted. During a visit in April 1840, the English archaeologist and explorer Charles Fellows noted the existence of over 100 stone tombs. Much of the city's archaeological remains has since been destroyed due to the growth of Kaş (formerly Andifili) during the modern period; most of the sarcophagi being destroyed when the local population used the flat-sided stones for building materials.

Surviving inscriptions written in the now extinct Lycian language date from the 4th century BCE. The restored Hellenistic amphitheatre at Antiphellus, originally built to seat 4000 spectators, and still largely complete, never possessed a permanent stone stage. Surviving ruins visible on the ground include the 4th century BCE Doric Tomb, which has a 1.9 metres (6 ft 3 in) high entrance and a chamber decorated with a relief of dancing girls; the King's Tomb, located in the centre of the modern town, which has a uniquely written and as yet untranslated Lycian inscription; a small 1st century BCE temple; rock tombs set in cliffs above the modern town; and parts of the city's ancient sea wall.

== History ==
The original Lycian name for Antiphellus (Ancient Greek: "the land opposite the rocks") was Habesos; according to the Roman military commander Pliny the Elder, the city's pre-Hellenic name was Habessus. The discovery of architectural elements, now in the Antalya Museum, have confirmed that the Lycians had settled there (and therefore also Phellus) by the 6th century BCE. It was entitled to one vote at the Lycian League, and emerged to be a centre of trade that minted its own coins. The area was invaded by the Persians in around the middle of the 6th century BCE.

Map showing the location of Phellus and Antiphellus

Located at the head of a bay on the region's southern coast, the settlement served during the Hellenic period as the port of the nearby inland city of Phellus, although despite the vulnerability of its coastal position, neither a defensive wall or an acropolis was ever built there. The earliest mention of the Greek name Antiphellus is on an inscription on a 4th-century-BCE tomb in Kaş, which describes the deceased man as originating from Antiphellus. As Phellus declined in importance, Antiphellus emerged to become the region's largest city.

The city, unlike Phellus, is mentioned in the Roman guidebook for sailors, the Stadiasmus Maris Magni. Roman imperial coins found at Antiphellus bear the legend Ἀντιφελλειτων ("of the Antiphellitans"). Pliny wrote that the softest sponges were found in the area. The Roman scholar Strabo incorrectly placed Antiphellus among the inland cities:

And in the interior are places called Phellus and Antiphellus and Chimaera, which last I have mentioned above.

— Strabo, Geographica

According to the Turkish archaeologist Cevdet Bayburtluoğlu, Antiphellus was probably affected by the earthquake that devastated the region in 141–142. The shock from this earthquake triggered a tsunami that inundated the Lycian coast and travelled a considerable distance inland. Funds known to have been donated to the city by Opramoas of Rhodiapolis may have been used to help repair the damage caused by this event.

The bishopric of Antiphellus was a suffragan of the metropolitan see of Myra, the capital of the Roman province of Lycia. Its bishop Theodorus took part in the Council of Chalcedon in 451. He also attended the provincial synod held in 458 in connection with the murder of Proterius of Alexandria, but because of health difficulties with his hands, the acts of the meeting were signed on his behalf by the priest Eustathius. No longer a residential bishopric, Antiphellus is today listed by the Catholic Church as a titular see.

The site is now in the municipality of Kaş, Turkey, which before the forcible population exchange between Greece and Turkey of 1922–1923 was called Andifili, and during the 19th century, Andiffelo.

== Archaeology ==
Antiphellus, all but deserted by 1828, and built up in the following decades, became known during the mid-19th century, both to scholars and travellers. The Irish naval officer Sir Francis Beaufort visited Antiphellus in the 19th century. He gave a description of what he found there, including the amphitheatre and groups of inscribed and plain sarcophagi, noting that the inscriptions he saw were: "from the rudeness of their execution, to be very antient. Intermixed with the usual Greek letters, there are several uncommon characters of which the following are a few specimens."

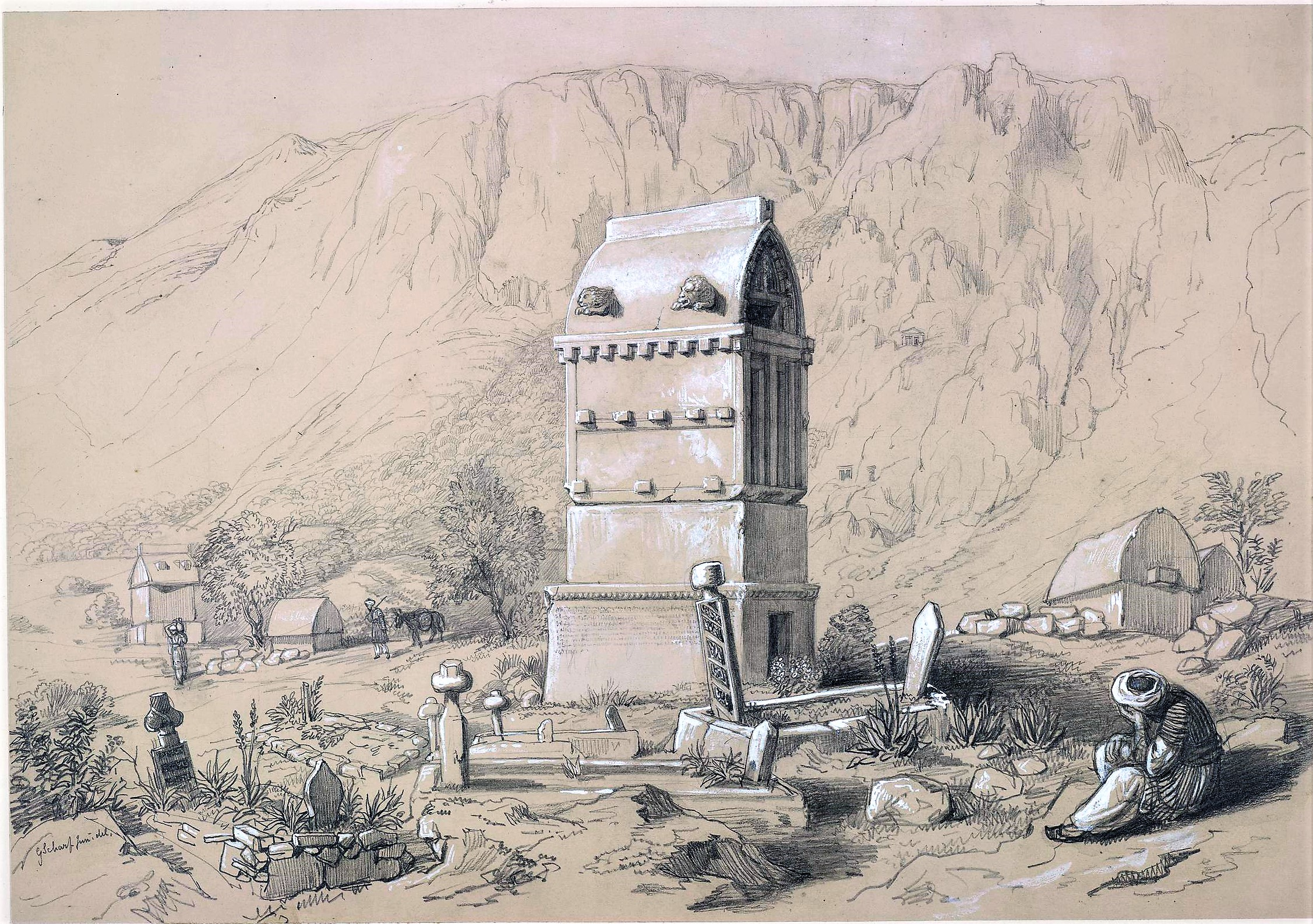
George Schaff 's illustration of tombs at Antiphellus (c. 1843)

The English archaeologist and explorer Charles Fellows saw the ruins of Antiphellus in April 1838. During a return visit in April 1840, Fellows noted the existence of over 100 tombs. In 1841, he produced drawings of specimens of ends of sarcophagi, pediments, and doors of tombs, and Thomas Abel Brimage Spratt's Travels in Lycia, Milyas, and the Cibyratis (1847) contains a plan of the ancient city's ruins. Fellows and his companions found a tomb with a bilingual inscription (a cast was made in 1844); and he sketched the pillar tomb that now stands in the centre of the modern town.

The abandoned Lycian settlement left hillside tombs, including a sarcophagus on a high base with a long inscription in "Lycian B", now generally identified as Milyan, a Luwian language. Inscriptions in the Lycian language are dated from the 4th century BCE, as are the earliest records in Greek inscriptions. One such inscription, copied by Fellows in 1840, contains the ethnic name ΑΝΤΙΦΕΛΛΕΙΤΟΥ. Much of the archaeology at Antiphellus has been lost due to the urban development of Kaş; Fellows observed that the settlement had expanded even since his previous visit and had swallowed up many of the ruins. Excavations carried out in the modern town in 1952 produced few results, leading the archaeological team to conclude that 4th century Antiphellus consisted of a few buildings, concentrated near the harbour.

== Description of existing ruins ==
=== Theatre ===
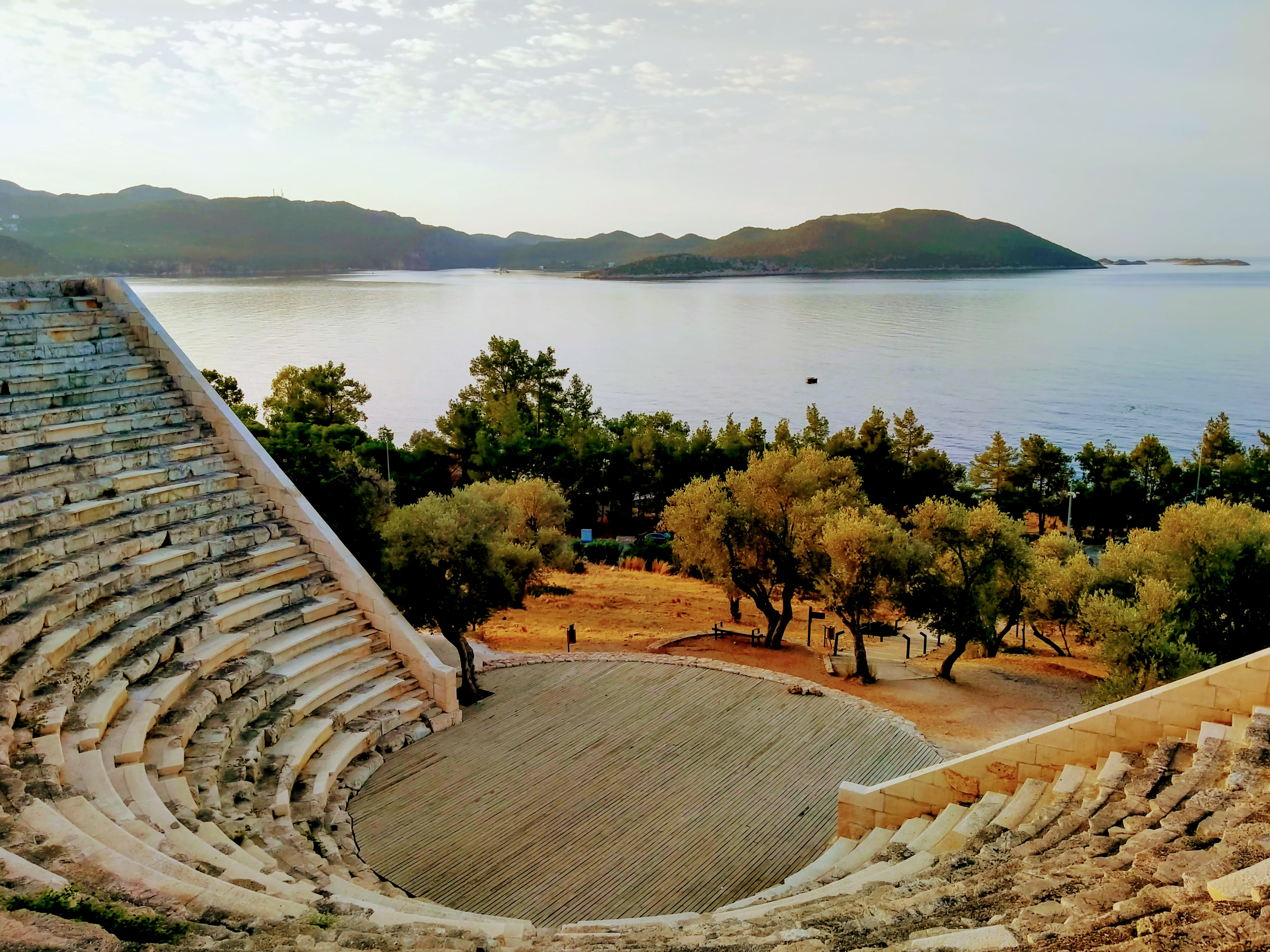
The theatre at Kaş

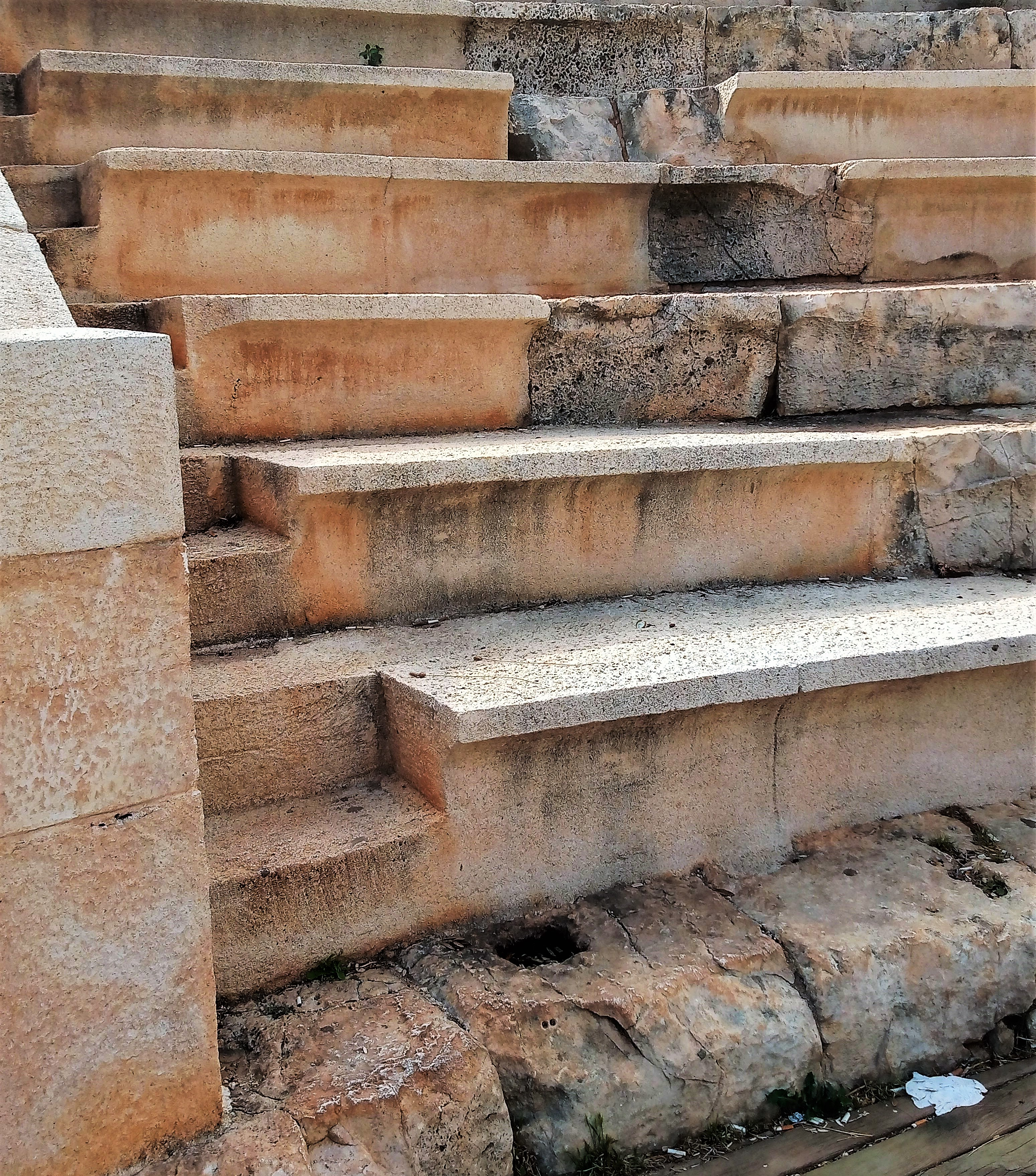
Details of the 2008 restoration

The Hellenistic theatre, which was restored in 2008, is located 500 metres (1,600 ft) from the centre of Kaş. It was capable of seating 4000 spectators. The theatre is the only structure of its type in Anatolia with a sea front. It is complete, but lacks a proscenium, so as to avoid blocking the view of the sea.

After the theatre was built, the east wall collapsed, possibly due to the earthquake that devastated the region in 141. Repairs to the wall are visible; the restoration work was done soon afterwards, probably by means of the funds provided to Antiphellus by Opramoas.

The retaining wall of the theatre, which curves around in slightly more than a semicircle, is built of irregular ashlar blocks, which vary in size and shape. There is no diazoma (the passage dividing the lower from the upper rows of seats), nor a permanent stone stage.

=== King's Tomb ===
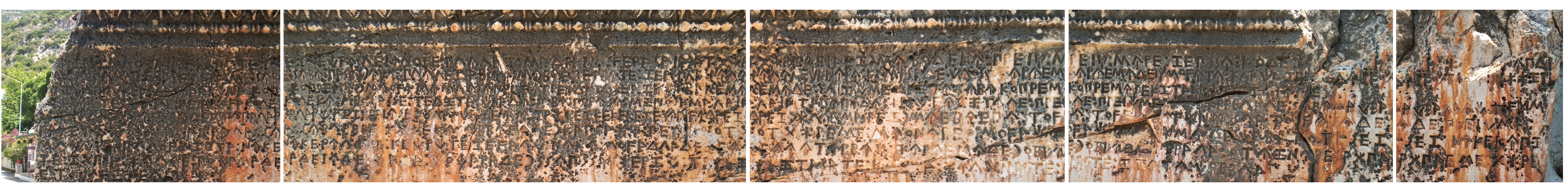
The inscription on the King's Tomb (the images overlap slightly). The characters are well preserved and still readable, although sometimes it is impossible to decide whether depressions on the surface are part of the text or not.

One of the town's sarcophagi is the 4th century BCE Lycian Inscribed Mausoleum, known locally as the King's Tomb, which is located on Uzunçarşı Street. It is in excellent condition. The hyposorium, which is cut from the solid rock, is approximately 5 feet (1.5 m) in height; the floor is sunken and the entrance is unsealed. The base is 30 inches (760 mm) high. On the hyposorium is an unusual type of Lycian epitaph, being in the form of a poem, as observed by Fellows in the 1840s, who wrote that "the inscription does not begin in the manner of any of those we have yet met with, nor does it contain any words of a funereal character". The text is written in the Milyan language (otherwise known as Lycian B), an extinct ancient Anatolian language attested from only three inscriptions: two poems on the Xanthian Obelisk, and the shorter inscription on the King's Tomb. The text has not been interpreted. The free space under the inscription suggests the text was supposed to be longer, and that the stonemason, intending to save space, accidentally left too much room.

The sarcophagus on top is cut from a separate block of stone. Two lions' heads project from the sides of the lid, which is divided into four panels showing standing figures in relief. The sarcophagus was kept for the tomb's builder and his wife, who are depicted in the front pediment as a bearded man leaning on a staff in front of a seated woman.

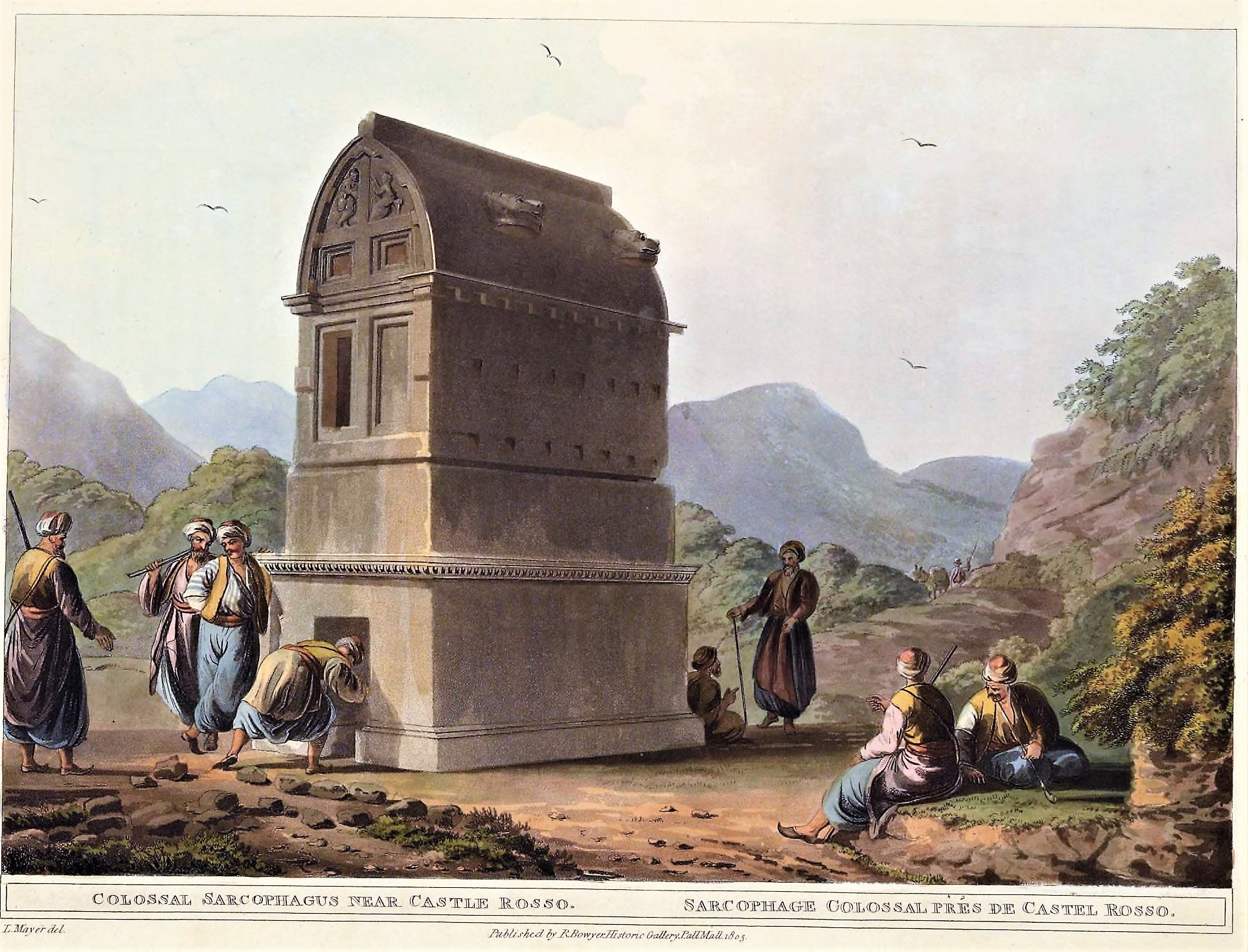
Luigi Mayer – Colossal Sarcophagus near Castle Rosso (1803)

The tomb was first depicted, but not discussed, in Luigi Mayer's Views in the Ottoman Empire, published in London in 1803. A copy of the inscription, made by the British archaeologist William Gell in 1812, was one of the first copies of any Lycian inscription. Between 1836 and 1842 the inscription was copied by the French historian Charles Texier, Charles Fellows, the classical philologist Julius August Schönborn, and the English artist Edward Thomas Daniell. It was copied again in 1882, 1892, and 1894, before the Austrian classical philologist Ernst Kalinka published the authoritative copy of the inscription in 1901.

=== Other remains ===
Most of the ancient tombs found by Fellows have since disappeared, as the local population used most of them for building materials. The isolated tomb above the amphitheatre, known as the Doric Tomb, is of a unique form. Cube shaped and cut into the rock face, with sides of 4.5 metres (15 ft). The east-facing entrance is 1.9 metres (6 ft 3 in) high and leads to a single chamber. One of the inside walls has a relief of dancing girls, now grimy due to the tomb's use as a shepherds' shelter. From the clothes worn by the dancers, scholars have dated the tomb to the first half of the 4th century BCE. The base has a moulding and a shallow pilaster at each corner; only one of the capitals has survived. On the south side a band with mutules is preserved. The entrance, which was originally closed by means of a sliding door, has a moulded frame.

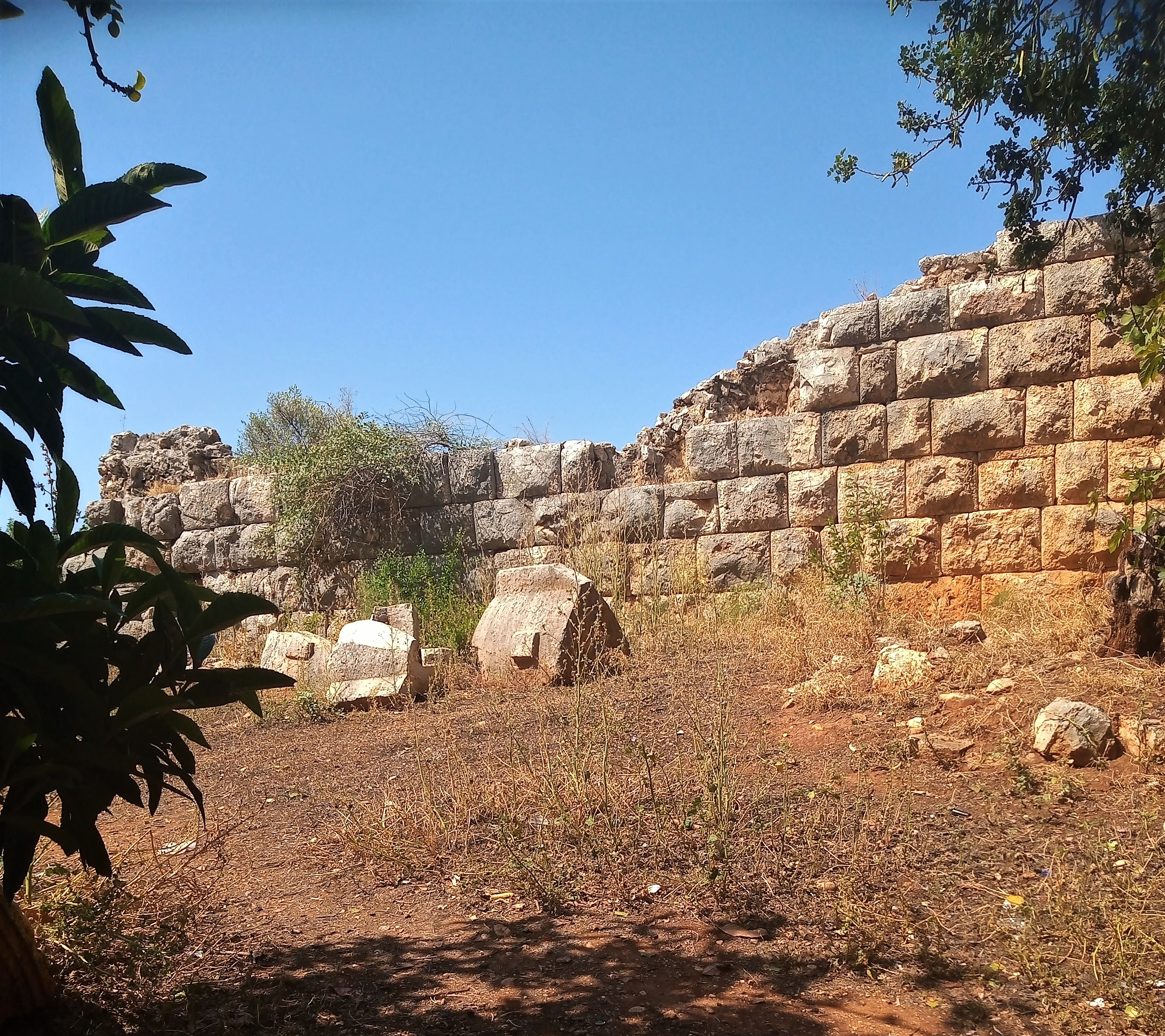
Part of the temple wall

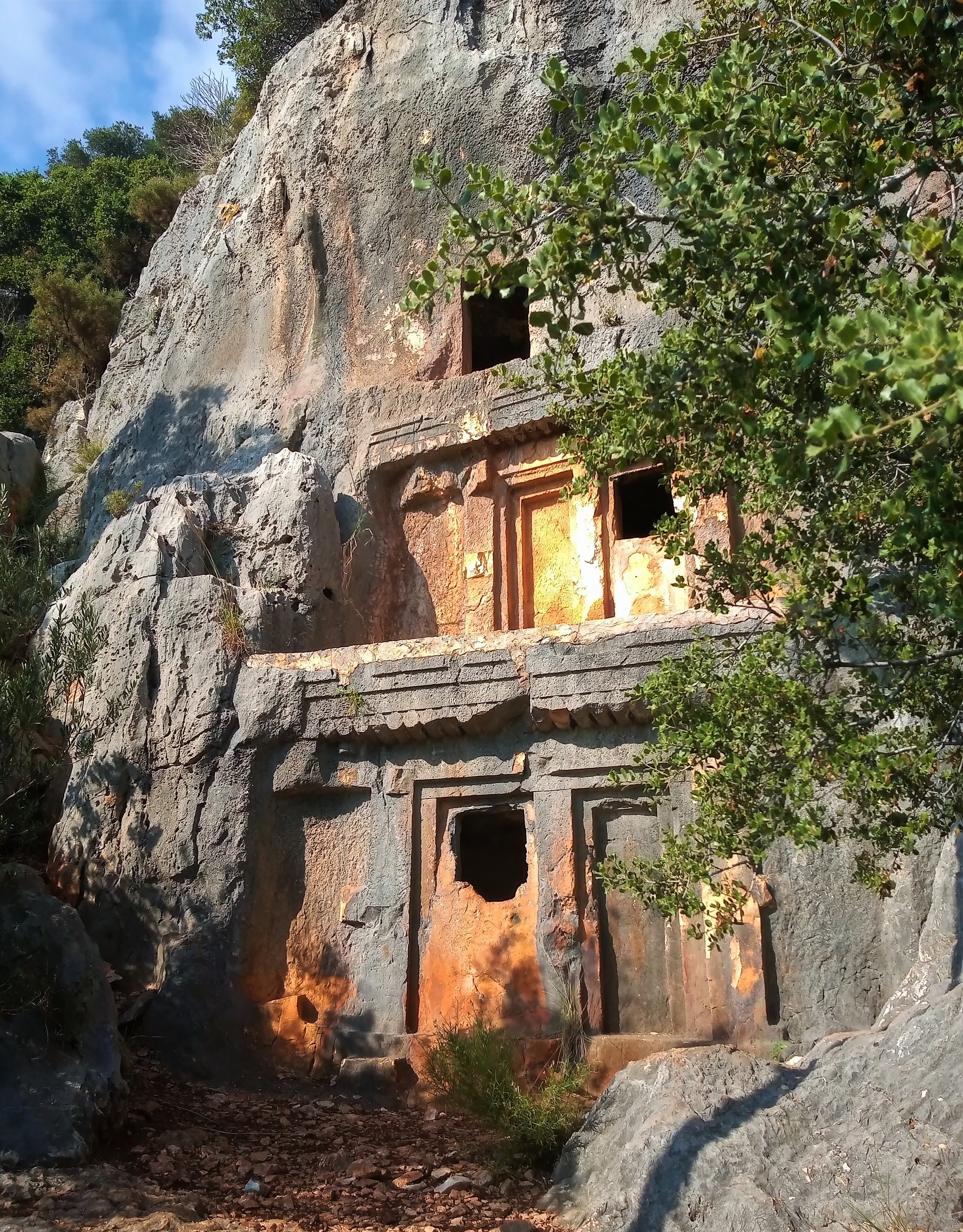
A rock tomb

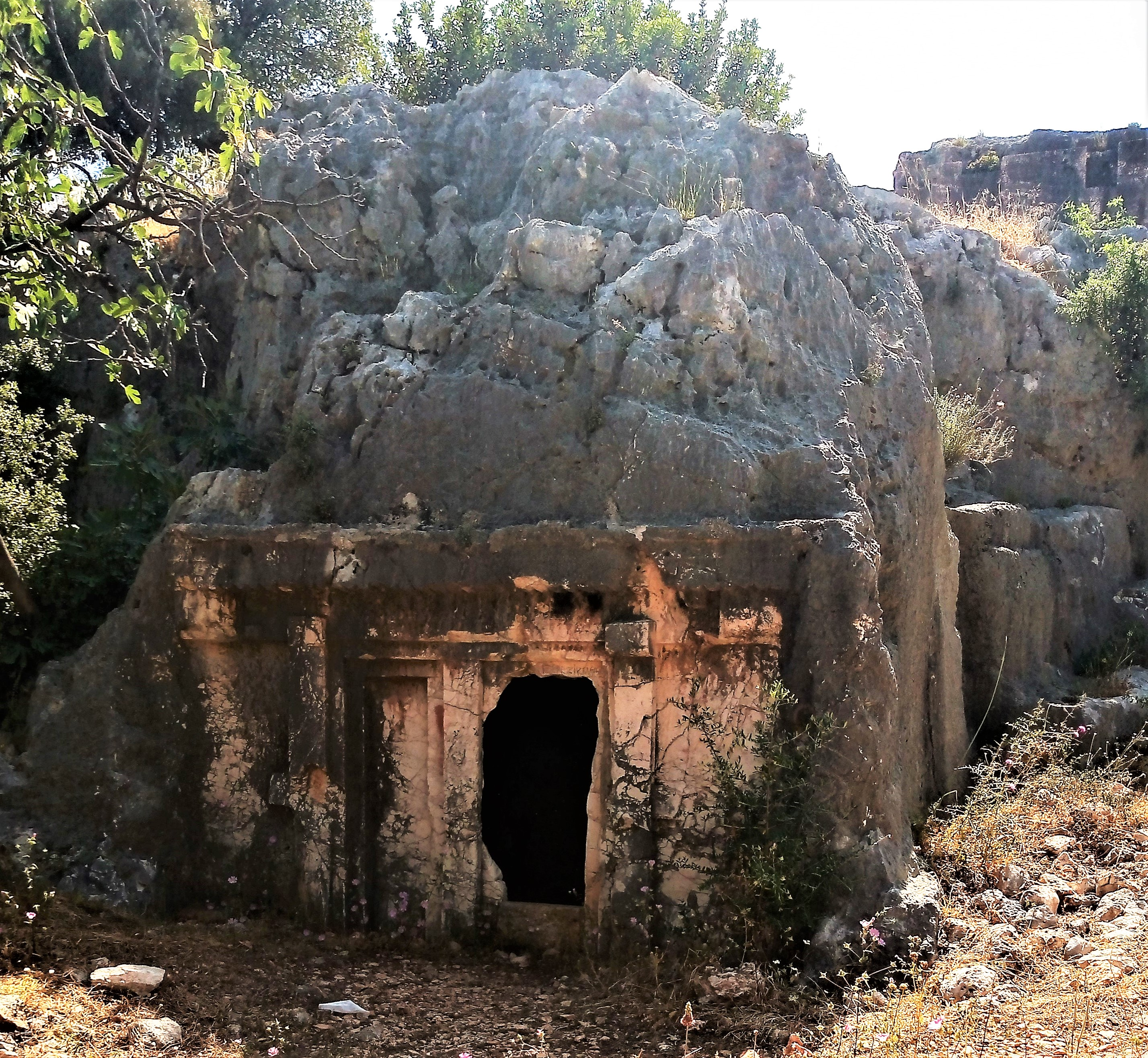
The Doric Tomb

The lower parts of a small temple have survived. The remains have a height of five blocks of rectangular ashlar. It was constructed in the 1st century BCE, with later additions added four centuries later. The temple was dedicated to an unknown god.

There are rock tombs in the cliffs just beyond the modern town, including one with both a Lycian inscription and a later one written in Latin. Remnants of a wall on the shoreline are still visible. The harbour lay on the seaward side of the isthmus, where a reef runs out to sea, providing protection; it may have been strengthened in ancient times. Antiphellus had neither an acropolis nor a city wall. The part of the ashlar sea-wall that survives to the west of the modern town stands six courses high for a length of over 500 yards (460 m).

== Sources ==
- Akşit, İlhan (2006). Kline, Stuart (ed.). Lycia: The Land of Light. Istanbul: Aksit Kultur Turizm Sanat Ajans Lt. ISBN 975-7039-11-X.
- Bayburtluoğlu, Cevdet (2004). Lycia. Antalya: Suna & İnan Kıraç Research Institute on Mediterranean Civilizations. ISBN 978-97570-7-820-3.
- Bean, George Ewart (1978). Lycian Turkey: An Archaeological Guide. London: Benn. ISBN 978-05100-3-205-0.
- Beaufort, Francis (1818). Karamania, or, A Brief Description of the South Coast of Asia-Minor and of the Remains of Antiquity: With plans, views, &c. collected during a survey of that coast, under the orders of the Lords commissioners of the Admiralty, in the Years 1811–1812 (2nd ed.). London: R. Hunter. OCLC 1229273123.
- Bryce, Trevor (2009). "Antiphellos". The Routledge Handbook of the Peoples and Places of Ancient Western Asia. New York: Routledge. ISBN 978-0-415-39485-7.
- Harris, Edward M.; Fachard, Sylvian, eds. (2021). The Destruction of Cities in the Ancient Greek World: Integrating the Archaeological and Literary Evidence. Cambridge: Cambridge University Press. ISBN 978-11084-9-554-7.
- Kalinka, Ernst (1901). Tituli Asiae Minoris (in Latin). Vol. 1. Vienna: Austrian Academy of Sciences. OCLC 150793192.
- Keen, Antony G. (2018). Dynastic Lycia: A Political History of the Lycians and Their Relations with Foreign Powers, C. 545-362 B.C. Leiden: Brill Publishers. ISBN 978-90043-5-152-3.
- Le Quien, Michel (1740). Oriens christianus, in quatuor patriarchatus digestus; quo exhibentur ecclesiae, patriarchae, caeterique praesules totius orientis (in Latin). Vol. 1. Paris.
- Long, George (1857). "Antiphellus". In Smith, William (ed.). Dictionary of Greek and Roman Geography. London: John Murray.
- Murray, John (1878). Handbook for Travellers in Turkey in Asia including Constantinople (4th ed.). London: John Murray. OCLC 1984586.
- Pius Bonifacius Gams (1931). Series episcoporum Ecclesiae Catholicae'. Leipzig: Hiersemann.
- Schürr, Diether (2005). "Das Pixre-Poem in Antiphellos". Kadmos (in German). 44 (1–2). Berlin: 95–164. doi:10.1515/KADM.2005.014. S2CID 161547409.
- Segreteria di Stato Vaticano (2013). Annuario pontificio (in Latin). The Vatican: Libreria Editrice Vaticana. ISBN 978-88209-9-070-1.
- Slatter, Enid (1994). Xanthus: Travels of Discovery in Turkey. London: Rubicon Press. ISBN 978-09486-9-531-5.
- Smith, William (1870). Dictionary of Greek and Roman Geography. Vol. 1. Boston: Little, Brown. OCLC 847907716.
- Spratt, Thomas Abel Brimage (1847). Travels in Lycia, Milyas, and the Cibyratis, in company with the Late E. T. Daniell. London: John van Voorst. LCCN 05010095.Volumes 1 and 2
- T.C. Antalya Valiliği (2010). Dünden Bugüne Antalya [Antalya From Past to Present] (in Turkish). Vol. 2. T.C. Kültür ve Turizm Bakanlığı.
- Varinlioglu, Guzden (2016). Digital in Underwater Cultural Heritage. Cambridge Scholars Publishing. ISBN 978-14438-9-210-0.
