= Sarıaydın inscription =

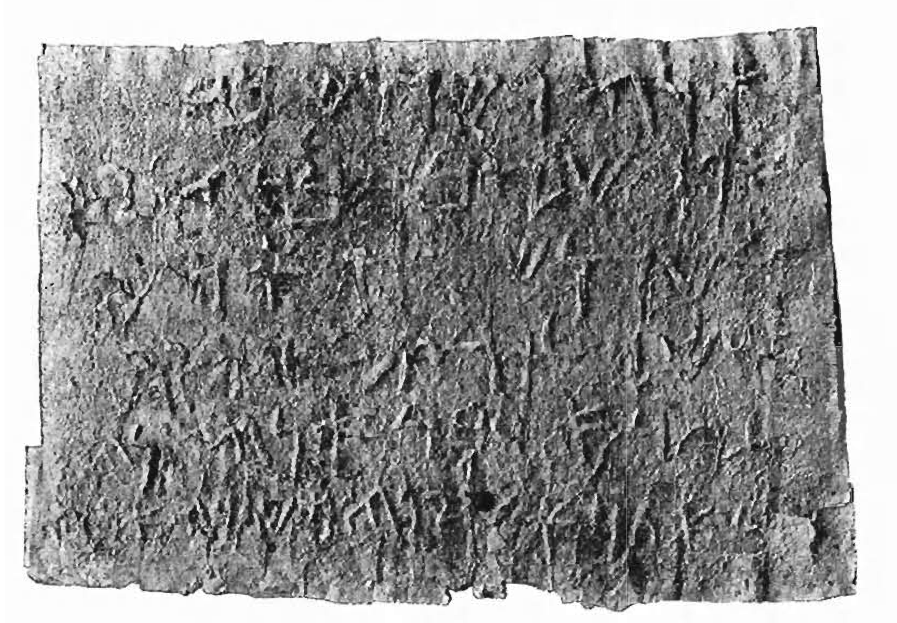
Sarıaydın inscription copy from 1896

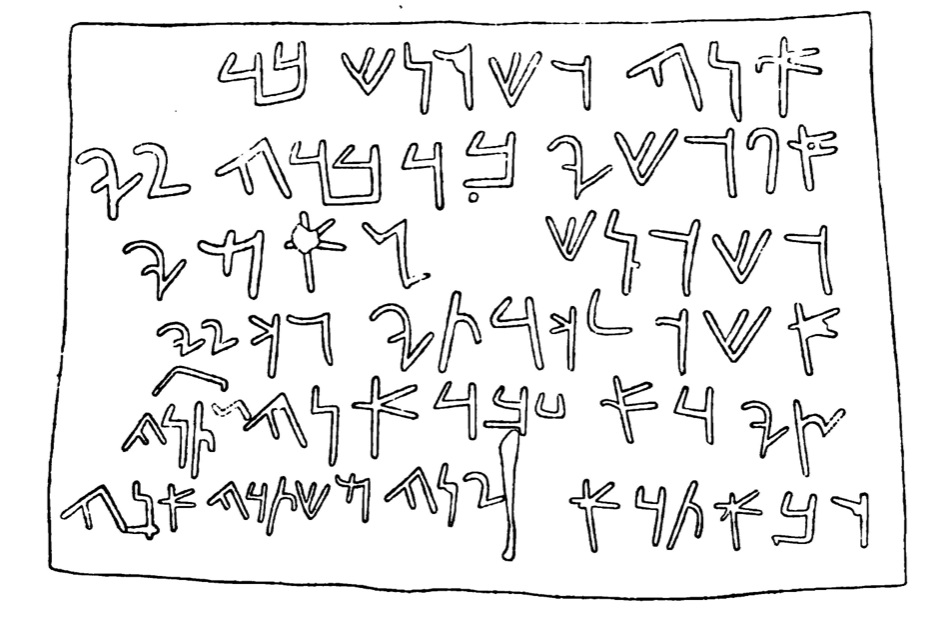
Sketch of inscription

The Sarıaydın inscription is an Aramaic inscription found in situ in 1892 near the village of Sarıaydın in Southern Anatolia. It is also known as the Sarıaydın Hunting inscription or the Cilician Hunting inscription. It was discovered on the Austrian expedition to Cilicia of Rudolf Heberdey and Adolf Wilhelm.

At the time of its discovery, it was only the fourth Aramaic inscription to be found in Anatolia, and the only one to consist of more than a few words. A possible translation is "I am Wšwnš son of ’pwšy, grandson of Wšwnš, and my mother is (unclear). While hunting here, in this place I camp".
