= Rudolf Heberdey =

Austrian philologist and archaeologist

Rudolf Heberdey (10 March 1864. Ybbs an der Donau – 7 April 1936, Graz) was an Austrian classical philologist and archaeologist.

== Biography ==
From 1882 he studied classical philology at the University of Vienna, where his influences were Wilhelm von Hartel, Karl Schenkl, Theodor Gomperz and Eugen Bormann, the latter of whom, introduced Heberdey to Roman epigraphy. In 1897 he received his doctorate with archaeologist Otto Benndorf as his academic sponsor.

From 1894 to 1898 he was assigned to the Kleinasiatischen Kommission (Asia Minor Commission) of the Vienna Academy, and afterwards, spent several years as secretary of the branch office at the Austrian Archaeological Institute in Smyrna (1898-1903). From 1903 to 1909 he served in the same capacity at the Austrian Archaeological Institute at Athens. In 1909 he became a professor of archaeology at the University of Innsbruck, and from 1911 to 1934, served as a professor at the University of Graz.

During his numerous travels he covered vast areas of Asia Minor. In 1891/92, with Adolf Wilhelm (1864-1950), he did archaeological studies in Cilicia. With Ernst Kalinka, he conducted investigations of southwestern Asia Minor, in particular, Lycia. In 1896 he began systematic excavatory work at Ephesus that led to extraordinary findings. He also performed important archaeological research involving the ruins of Termessos in Pisidia (1892, 1902).

== Selected works ==
- Die Reisen des Pausanias in Griechenland, 1894 – Journey of Pausanias in Greece.
- Bericht über zwei reisen im südwestlichen Kleinasien (with Ernst Kalinka), 1896 – Two journeys in southwestern Asia Minor.
- Opramoas; Inschriften von heroon zu Rhodiapolis, 1897 – Opramoas; inscriptions of the heroon of Rhodiapolis.
- Das Theater in Ephesos, 1912 – The theater at Ephesus.
- Altattische porosskulptur, ein beitrag zur geschichte der archaischen griechischen kunst, 1919.
- Termessische studien, 1929 – Termessian studies.

He also made important contributions to the "Tituli Asiae Minoris" (TAM; a collection of inscriptions of the Vienna Academy).
