= Tlos =

Lycian ruins in Turkey

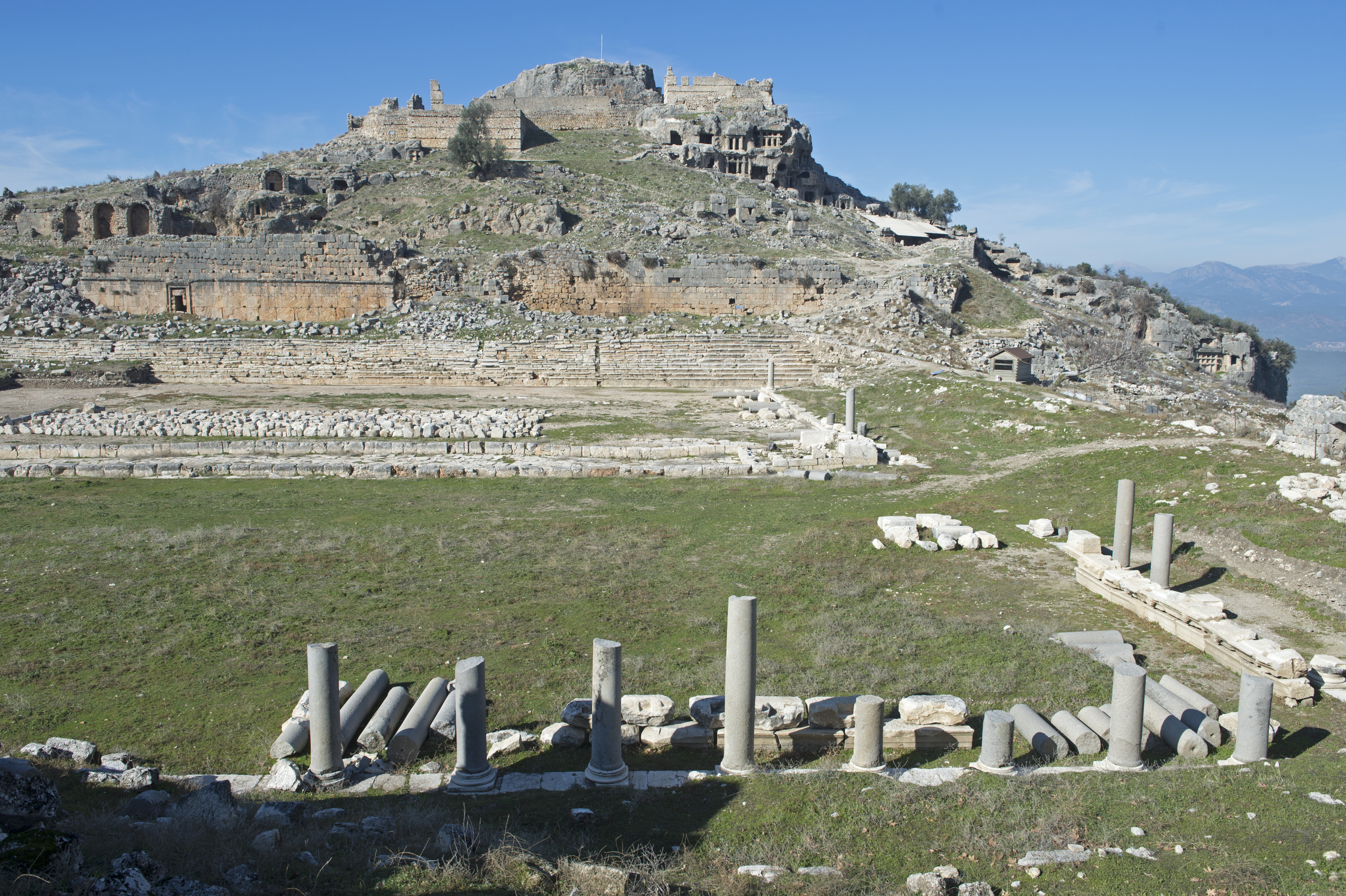
- The Acropolis

- Location within Turkey
- 36°33′9.13″N 29°25′14.86″E
- Type: Settlement
- Cultures: Lycian, Roman, Byzantine, Ottoman
- Location: Mugla Province, Turkey
- Region: Lycia

Tlos (Lycian: 𐊗𐊍𐊀𐊇𐊀 Tlawa, Hittite: 𒁕𒆷𒉿 Dalawa, Ancient Greek: Τλώς or Τλῶς) was an ancient Lycian city near the modern town of Seydikemer in the Mugla Province of southern Turkey, some 4 kilometres northwest of Saklıkent Gorge.

It was one of the oldest and largest cities of Lycia.

== Location ==
Tlos lies on the east side of the Xanthos valley atop a rocky outcrop that slopes up from a plateau from a modern village and ends on the west, north and northeast in almost perpendicular cliffs.

== Name ==
The Greek name Tlos comes from the earlier Lycian name Tlawa. The city is mentioned as Dalawa in Hittite documents.

== History ==
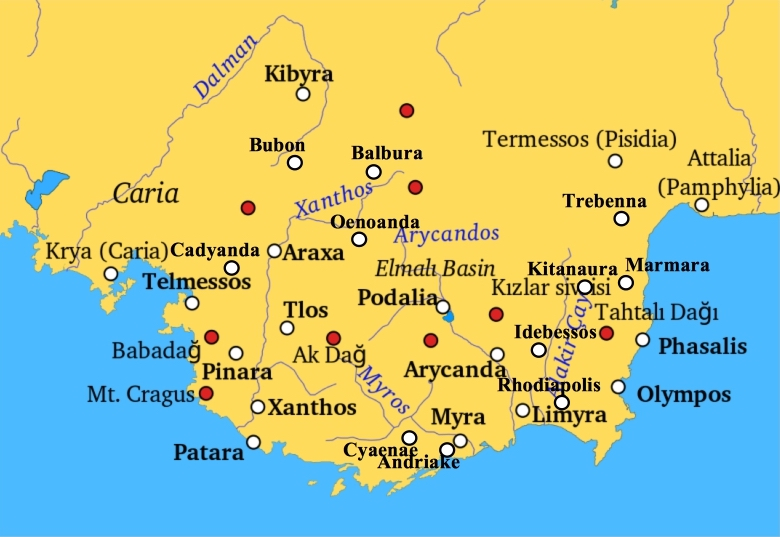
Cities of ancient Lycia

Archaeological remains from the city centre and at nearby sites (the caves at Girmeler and Tavabaşı) suggest that the foundation of the city started more than 4,000 years ago.

It is known as 'Tlawa' in local Lycian inscriptions and as ‘Dalawa’ in the Hittite sources which shows the importance of the city as early as the 15th century BC in the Late Bronze Age.

Tlos seemingly became part of the Persian Empire and lost its independence when the Persians led by Harpagus invaded Lycia in 540 BC. It became prosperous during this period of Persian rule from the 5th to the late 4th century BC. Later, in the Hellenistic period, its importance is shown by being one of the six principal cities of the Lycian League to which in 168 BC Rome granted autonomy instead of dependence on Rhodes. Inscriptions reveal that citizens of Tlos were divided into demes (social subdivisions), and the names of three of them are known: Bellerophon, Iobates and Sarpedon, famous Lycian heroes of legend.

In the Roman era it kept its importance within the Lycian League when the city bore the title of ‘very brilliant metropolis of the Lycian nation’.

An earthquake in 141 AD destroyed many monuments of the city. Opramoas of Rhodiapolis and another wealthy philanthropist financed much 2nd-century AD civic re-building works. Another earthquake caused much destruction in 240 AD.

A Jewish community is also known to have existed with its own magistrates.

== In myth ==
In mythology, it was the city inhabited by hero Bellerophon and his winged horse Pegasus. It is known that the king-type tomb in the necropolis is dedicated to Bellerophon.

The Byzantine grammarian Stephanus of Byzantium reports a mythic tradition that the city was named after one of the sons of the nymph Praxidike (Ancient Greek: Πραξιδίκη) and Tremilus (Ancient Greek: Τρέμιλος). Praxidike was a daughter of Ogyges (Ancient Greek: Ωγύγης).

== The Site ==
Tlos was rediscovered by Charles Fellows in 1838 and was followed by the explorer Thomas Abel Brimage Spratt, who thought that "a grander site for a great city could scarcely have been selected in all Lycia."

Regular excavations have been undertaken by an interdisciplinary team since 2005.

The influence of many cultures upon Tlos has resulted in a patchwork of buildings dominated by an acropolis and fortress.

In early Lycian times the city's settlement was likely concentrated on the southern and western slopes. Wide terraces with cisterns and the back walls of buildings carved from the rock are found there, as well as an agora, a theatre for plays and concerts, public Roman baths and the remains of an early Byzantine church.

=== The Acropolis ===
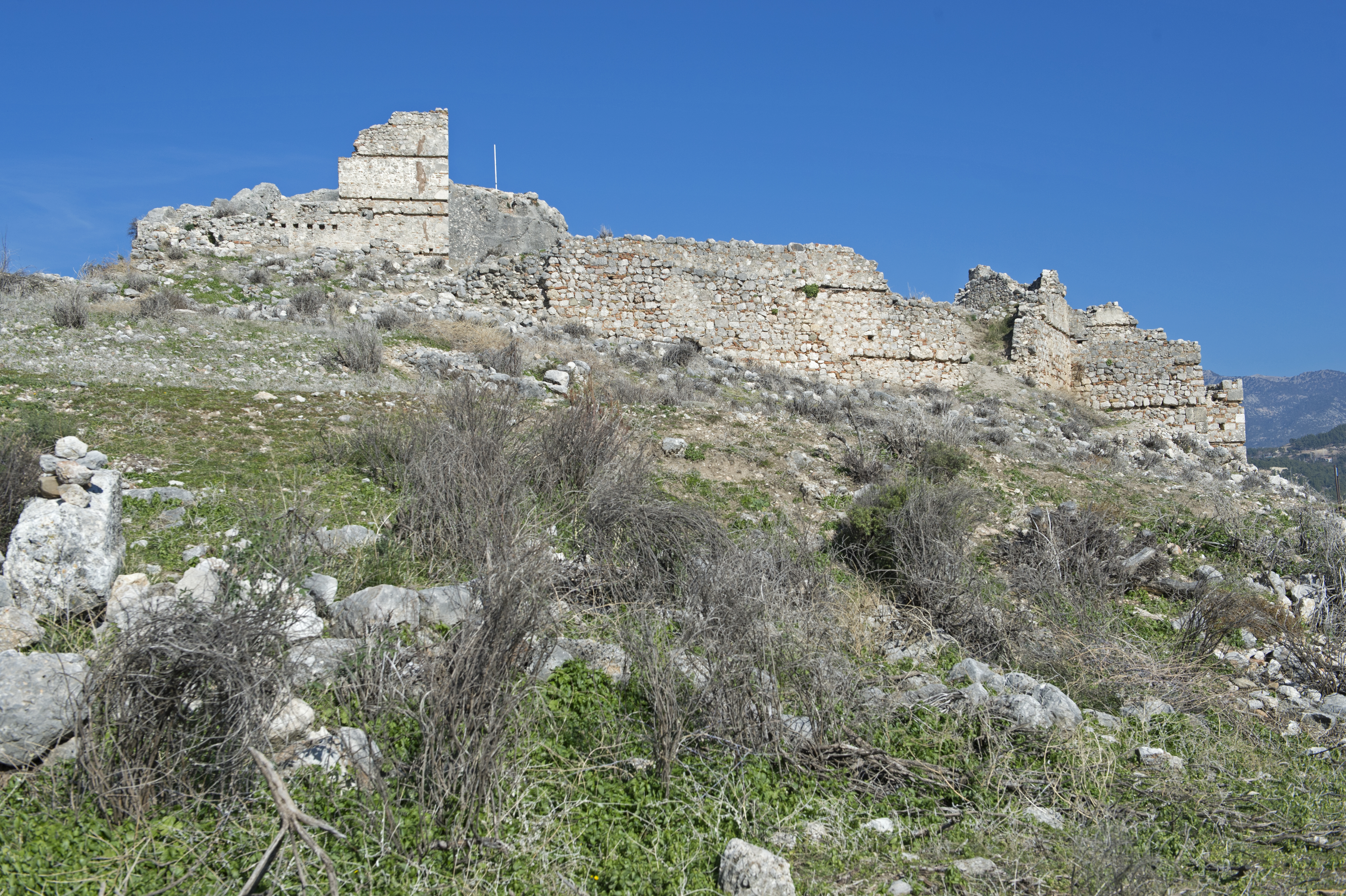
Acropolis

The top of the hill was chosen for the ruler's palace complex dating from the early Classical period. A Lycian fortress there is evident by the remains of a Lycian wall and Roman-era wall. The Ottomans constructed a fort for the local feudal governor Kanlı Ali Ağa (Bloody Chief Ali) upon the foundations of the fortress.

Public buildings dating from the Hellenistic period lie on the slopes of the acropolis. The sanctuary thought to be for the local Lycian deity Trggas stands on a platform formed by quarrying the rock on the northern slope of the acropolis next to the palace.

On the slopes leading up to the acropolis are numerous Lycian sarcophagi and many house-type of rock tombs and temple-type rock tombs cut into the rock face of the hill. One such is the Tomb of Bellerophon, a large temple-type tomb with an unfinished facade of four columns featuring a relief in its porch of the legendary hero Bellerophon riding on his winged horse so called as Pegasus. A carving of a lion or leopard is inside the tomb.

=== The Stadium ===
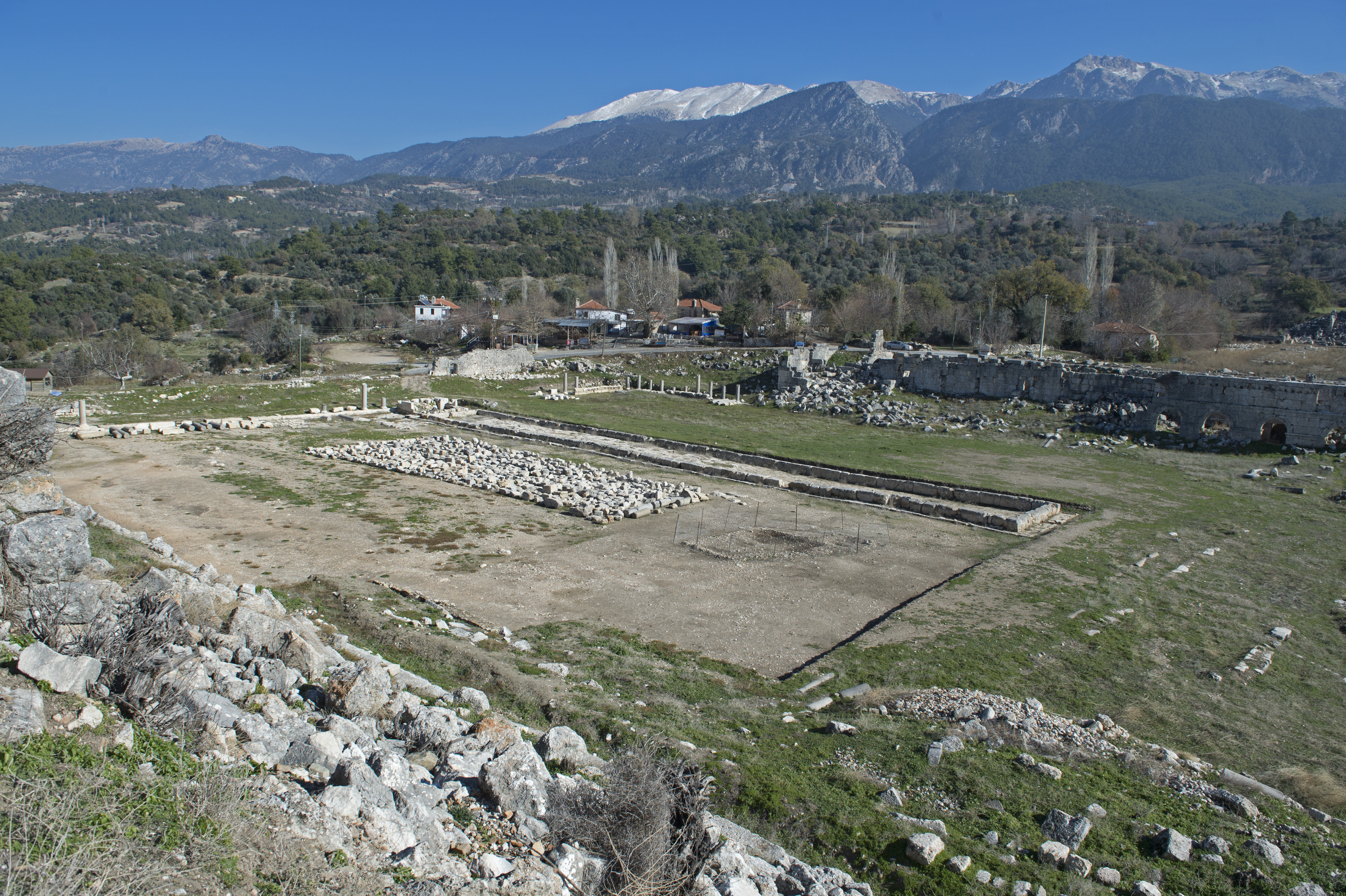
The Stadium

At the foot of the hill is a stadium with seating capacity for 2,500 people. It dates from the Hellenistic period with additions and alterations from the Roman period.

A long pool of 72 x 8.3 m and 1 m depth in parallel to the track of the stadium is well preserved and has a fountain in front. This pool shows that the stadium area was also used for social and ritual activities. The northern, southern and eastern sides of the stadium were originally surrounded a columned portico.

Parallel with the stadium is what researchers presume is two-storey, 150-metre long market more than 30 feet wide with small rectangular doors and large arched doors in its west wall. The building is constructed of carefully jointed ashlar masonry. At the south end is a wider building with several chambers and four large arched doors.

=== The Baths ===
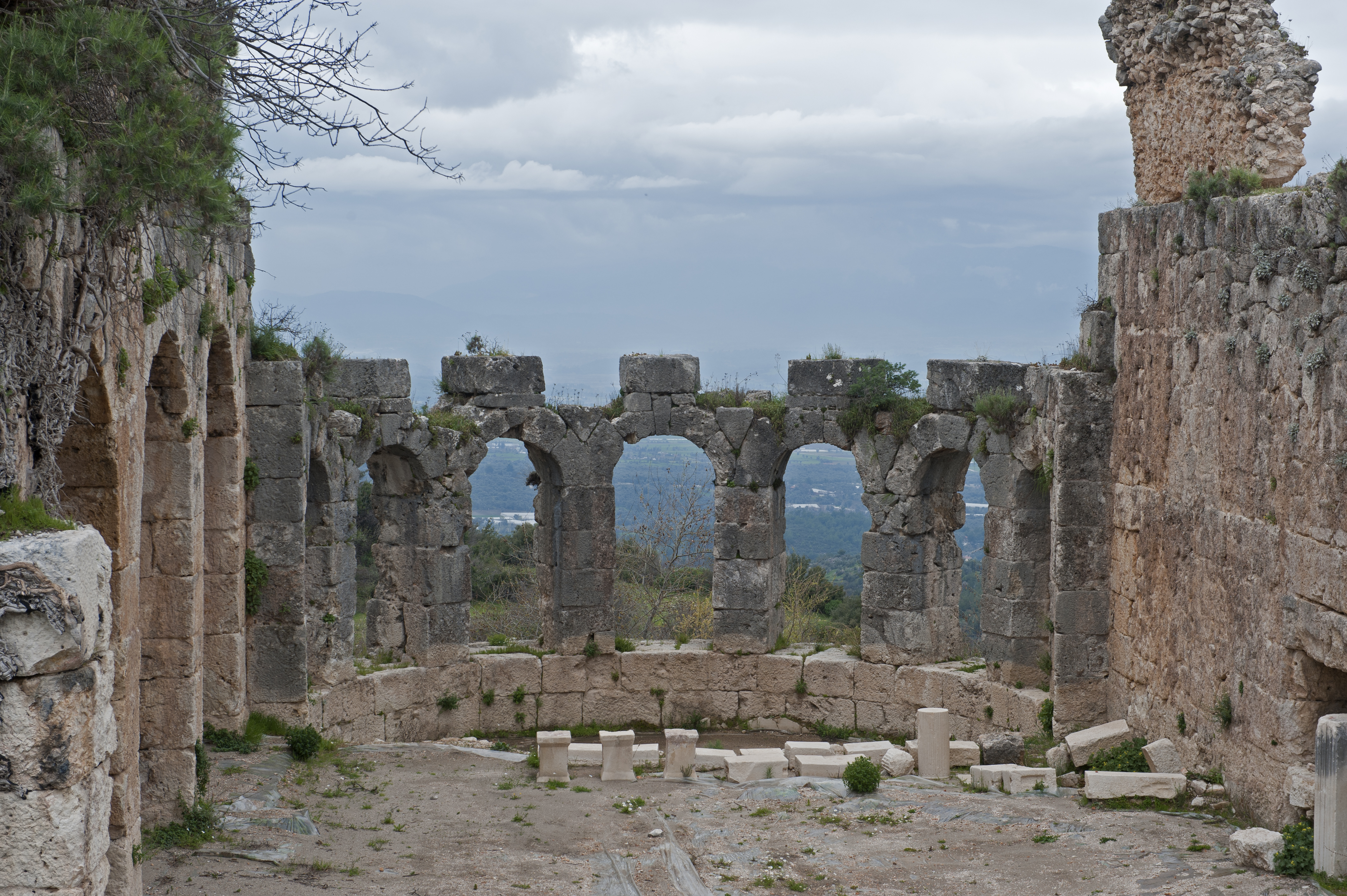
Great Roman Baths

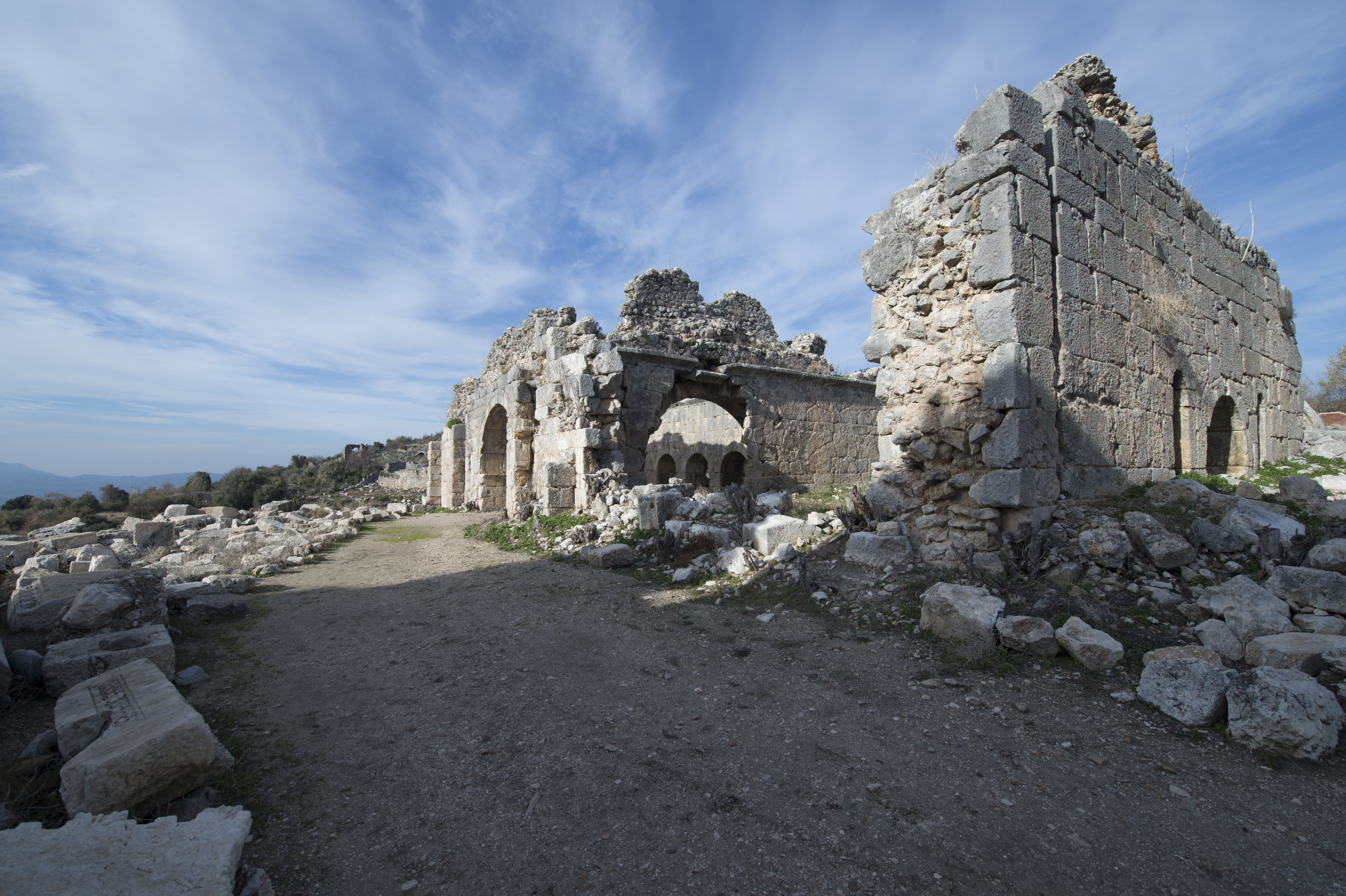
Small Roman baths

There are two adjacent baths; the Great Bath is located on a slope southwest of the city centre and consists of three rooms following the plan of typical Lycian baths. An apse with seven windows overlooks the Tlos valley below. This room could be the "exedra in the public baths" donated by Opramoas to Tlos and would date to 100-150 AD.

The eastern room of the bath with a monumental door is the cold room (frigidarium). A small pool at the top of steps was also built in the apsidal part of the room. Two doors in the western wall connect to the warm room (tepidarium) heated from the floor and the side walls. The western room was the hot room (caldarium). Because of a small Byzantine church built into it, the warm room has lost most of it original features. The cold room was also used as a cemetery in the Byzantine period.

The smaller public bath was probably first built in the early Roman period and comprises three rooms but does not have the plan of a typical Lycian baths. The eastern room is the cold room (frigidarium). An arched gate on the northern wall leads to a palaestra measuring 63 x 45 m and surrounded by a colonnade. The northern and southern sides of the palaestra also contain dressing rooms and a fountain. Inscriptions indicate that the baths were restored after the devastating earthquake of the 141 AD and again after a second in 240 AD. Another room to the west may have been part of the complex. All the rooms had barrel-vaulted ceilings.

Also near the baths are the remains of a Byzantine church, temple and what is believed to have been the agora. The latter is located across the road from the theatre.

=== The Theatre ===
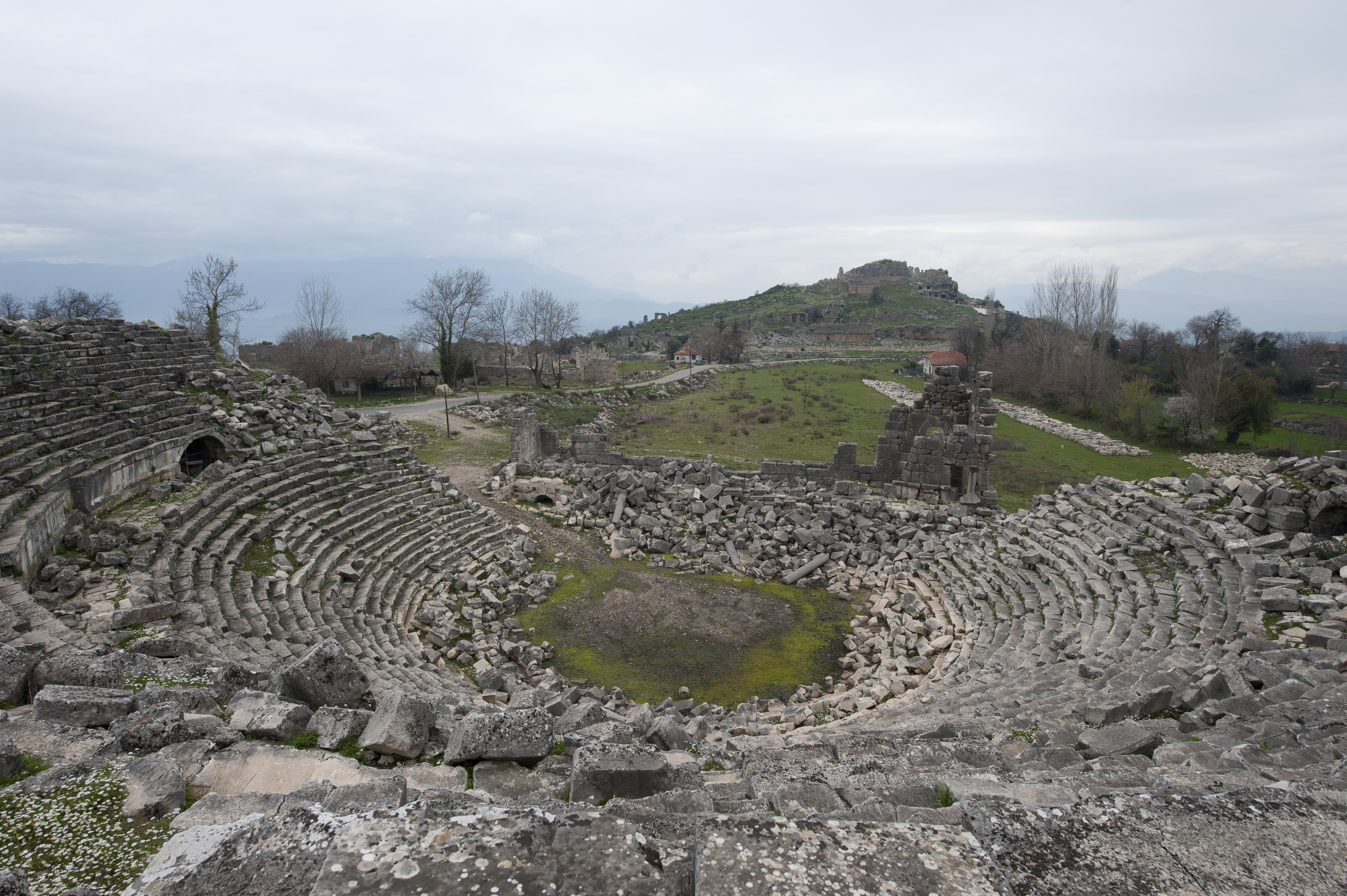
Roman Theatre

The theatre lies on the eastern slope of the city and is one of the best preserved monuments. Architectural details and an inscription mentioning its restoration in the 1st century BC indicate that it might have been built in the Hellenistic period. Inscriptions also record that donations were made by private citizens and priests, ranging from 3,000 denarii by the priest of Dionysus and high priest of the Cabiria to lesser amounts of 100 denarii. The benefactor Opramoas also made a very large donation for the theatre. The inscriptions uncovered here show that it witnessed several renovations in the Roman period over at least 150 years.

It was once one of the major theatres of Lycia in terms of its architectural design, with its three-storey stage and large auditorium (cavea). A small temple on the top level of the auditorium also makes it unusual. The diameter of the orchestra, slightly exceeding a semicircular shape, is 20.5 m. The stone seats reserved for VIPs (proedria) are placed above the horizontal walkway. Another notable feature is the floral and figurative stone decorations on the façade of the stage.

== Bishopric ==
Tlos became a Christian bishopric, a suffragan of the metropolitan see of Mira, capital of the Roman province of Lycia. It was represented at the Council of Chalcedon in 451 by its bishop Andreas, who also was a signatory of the letter that in 458 the bishops of the province sent to Byzantine Emperor Leo I the Thracian about the murder of Proterius of Alexandria. Eustathius was at the synod convoked by Patriarch Menas of Constantinople in 536. Ioannes was at the Trullan Council of 692. Constantinus took part in the Second Council of Nicaea (787). Another Andreas was at the Photian Council of Constantinople (879).

No longer a residential bishopric, Tlos is today listed by the Catholic Church as a titular see.

Among the titular bishops of Tlos were: George Hilary Brown (titular bishop 22 April 1842 – 29 September 1850, when he was created bishop of Liverpool), Charles-François Baillargeon (titular bishop 14 January 1851 – 25 August 1867, when he was created Archbishop of Quebec), Martin Griver (titular bishop 1 October 1869 – 22 July 1873, when he was created bishop of Perth, Australia); Eugène-Louis Kleiner (titular bishop from 17 June 1910 until his death on 19 August 1915); Paciano Aniceto (titular bishop from 7 April 1979 until 20 October 1983, when he was created Bishop of Iba); Carl Anthony Fisher (titular bishop from 23 December 1986 until his death on 2 September 1993). The most recent titular bishop was António Vitalino Dantas, who was titular bishop of Tlos and auxiliary bishop of Lisbon from 3 July 1996 to 25 January 1999.
