= Eugen Bormann =

German-Austrian historian (1842–1917)

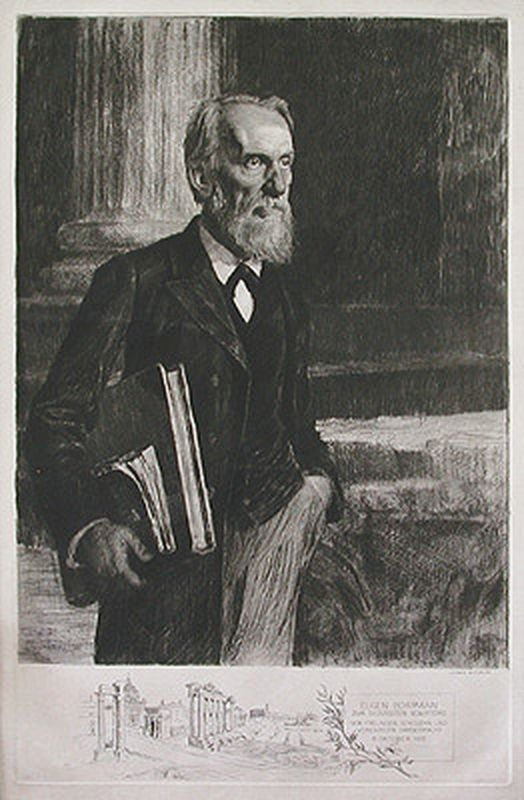
Eugen Bormann

Eugen Ludwig Bormann (6 October 1842, Hilchenbach – 4 March 1917, Klosterneuburg) was a German-Austrian historian, known for his work in the field of Latin epigraphy.

He studied at the University of Bonn as a pupil of Otto Jahn and Friedrich Ritschl, and at the University of Berlin, where his influences were August Boeckh, Eduard Gerhard and especially Theodor Mommsen. As an employee of the Corpus Inscriptionum Latinarum, he spent several years conducting research in Italy. Following military service during the Franco-Prussian War (in which he was badly wounded), he taught courses in classical languages at the Gymnasium zum Grauen Kloster in Berlin.

In 1881 he was appointed professor of ancient history at the University of Marburg, then in 1885, relocated as a professor to the University of Vienna. Here, he became a member of the Academy of Sciences.

He is credited with expansion of the Archäologisch-epigraphische Seminar (Archaeological-epigraphic Seminar), a scholarly entity that was founded by Otto Hirschfeld and Alexander Conze. In addition to his extensive work on the Corpus Inscriptionum Latinarum, he edited the epigraphic material collected from the Roman Limes in Austria (Carnuntum, Lauriacum). With archaeologist Ernst Kalinka, he published a treatise on ancient monuments found in Bulgaria, titled "Antike Denkmäler in Bulgarien".

The thoroughfare, Eugen Bormann-Gasse in Vienna Donaustadt (22nd District), is named in his honor.
