= Adolf Wilhelm (philologist) =

Austrian classical philologist and epigrapher

Adolf Wilhelm (10 September 1864, in Tetschen – 10 August 1950, in Vienna) was an Austrian classical philologist and epigrapher.

From 1882 to 1886 he studied classical philology at the University of Graz, and from 1889 to 1892, conducted research in Greece and Asia Minor. In 1894 he obtained his habilitation at the University of Vienna, where from 1905 to 1933 he taught classes as a professor of ancient Greek philology and epigraphy.

In 1898 he was appointed secretary of the Österreichisches Archäologische Institut in Athens. He was the editor of numerous articles in the Realencyclopädie der classischen Altertumswissenschaft. He was one of the first that have studied the Antikythera Mechanism, especially the texts of the manual of this ancient computer and concluded that it was a clock. He was also author of many articles in the Jahreshefte des Österreichischen Archäologischen Institutes in Wien ("Annual Reviews of the Austrian Archaeological Institute in Vienna") and the Mitteilungen des Deutschen Archäologischen Instituts, Athenische Abteilung ("Releases of the German Archaeological Institute, Athenian department").

== Selected works ==
- Reisen in Kilikien, ausgeführt 1891 und 1892 im auftrage der Kaiserlichen akademie der wissenschaften (with Rudolf Heberdey and Heinrich Kiepert, 1896) – Travels in Cilicia, performed in 1891/92 on behalf of the Imperial Academy of Sciences.
- Zu Griechischen Inschriften: aus den archäologisch-epigraphischen Mittheilungen aus Österreich-Ungarn, 1897 – On Greek inscriptions: from the archaeological-epigraphical reports of Austria-Hungary.
- Urkunden dramatischer Aufführungen in Athen (with Georg Kaibel, 1906) – Documents of dramatic performances in Athens.
- Beiträge zur griechischen Inschriftenkunde mit einem Anhange über die öffentliche Aufzeichung von Urkunden, 1909 – Contributions involving Greek inscriptions.
- Neue Beiträge zur griechischen Inschriftenkunde, 1911 – New contributions involving Greek inscriptions.
- Attische Urkunden, 1911 – Attic reports.
- Griechische Epigramme aus Kreta, 1950 – Greek epigrams of Crete.
