= Ernst Kalinka =

Austrian classical philologist

Ernst Kalinka (5 February 1865, Vienna – 15 June 1946, Hall in Tirol) was an Austrian classical philologist and archaeologist. He is considered to be a typical representative of the erstwhile Viennese school of classical studies, in which, the disciplines of philology, epigraphy and archaeology were intertwined as an inseparable unity.

== Biography ==
From 1884 to 1889 he studied classical philology, ancient history and classical archaeology at the University of Vienna, where his influences included Otto Benndorf, Wilhelm von Hartel and Karl Schenkl. Following study trips to Germany, France, Italy and Greece, he conducted research in the Asia Minor section of the Ottoman Empire (1892–94) in preparation for the publication of "Tituli Asiae Minoris", a project directed by the Vienna Academy. In 1894 he became a member of the newly established archaeology department at Constantinople. In 1896 he obtained his habilitation for classical philology at the University of Vienna, and during the following year, took part in a research trip to Bulgaria.

In 1898 he was appointed secretary of the newly founded Österreichisches Archäologisches Institut (ÖAI). In 1900 he became a professor of classical philology at the University of Czernowitz, and three years later, relocated to the University of Innsbruck, where from 1903 to 1935, he worked as a professor. In 1910/11 he served as academic rector. In 1906 he founded the journal "Commentationes Aenipontanae", a publication that he co-edited up until 1921.

== Selected works ==
- Prolegomena zur pseudoxenophontischen Athenaion politeia, 1896 – Introduction to the pseudo-Xenophonian constitution of the Athenians.
- Bericht über zwei Reisen im südwestlichen Kleinasien (with Rudolf Heberdey), 1897 – On two trips to southwestern Asia Minor.
- Zur historischen topographie Lykiens, 1900 – The historical topography of Lycia.
- Zu Thukydides, 1902 – On Thucydides.
- Antike Denkmäler in Bulgarien, 1906 – Ancient monuments in Bulgaria.
- Xenophontis qui inscribitur libellus Athēnaiōn politeia; in usum scholarum academicarum, 1914 (edition of Xenophon).
- Aus der Werkstatt des Hörsaals, 1922 – From the workshop of the auditorium.
- Agamemnon in der Ilias, 1943 – Agamemnon in the Iliad.

In 1927 he contributed "Hellenica Oxyrhynchia" to the Bibliotheca Teubneriana (collection of Greco-Roman literature).
