= Opramoas =

- Born: Rhodiapolis, Lycia
- Died: Rhodiapolis, Lycia
- Occupations: Civic benefactor (Euergetes); Magnate; High priest; Lyciarch (likely)
- Era: Roman Empire
- Known for: Longest Greek inscription in Anatolia
- Notable work: Mausoleum of Opramoas (built by him)

Opramoas was an important civic benefactor in the 2nd century CE. He is the best known ancient euergete. He was a magnate from the small Lycian town of Rhodiapolis (southern Anatolia, in modern Turkey). His activities are recorded in extensive Greek inscriptions on the walls of his mausoleum at Rhodiapolis.

"...apart from his gifts of games and a mass of civic buildings, we have recently found him offering to pay for the primary schooling of all the citizen-children at Xanthus, boys and girls alike"..."he gave funds for burial to people in need and paid the dowries of poor families' daughters"

He is mentioned in the French author Marguerite Yourcenar's novel Memoirs of Hadrian.
