= Rhodiapolis =

City in ancient Lycia

- Ῥοδιάπολις (Greek)
- Rhodia, Rhodiopolis
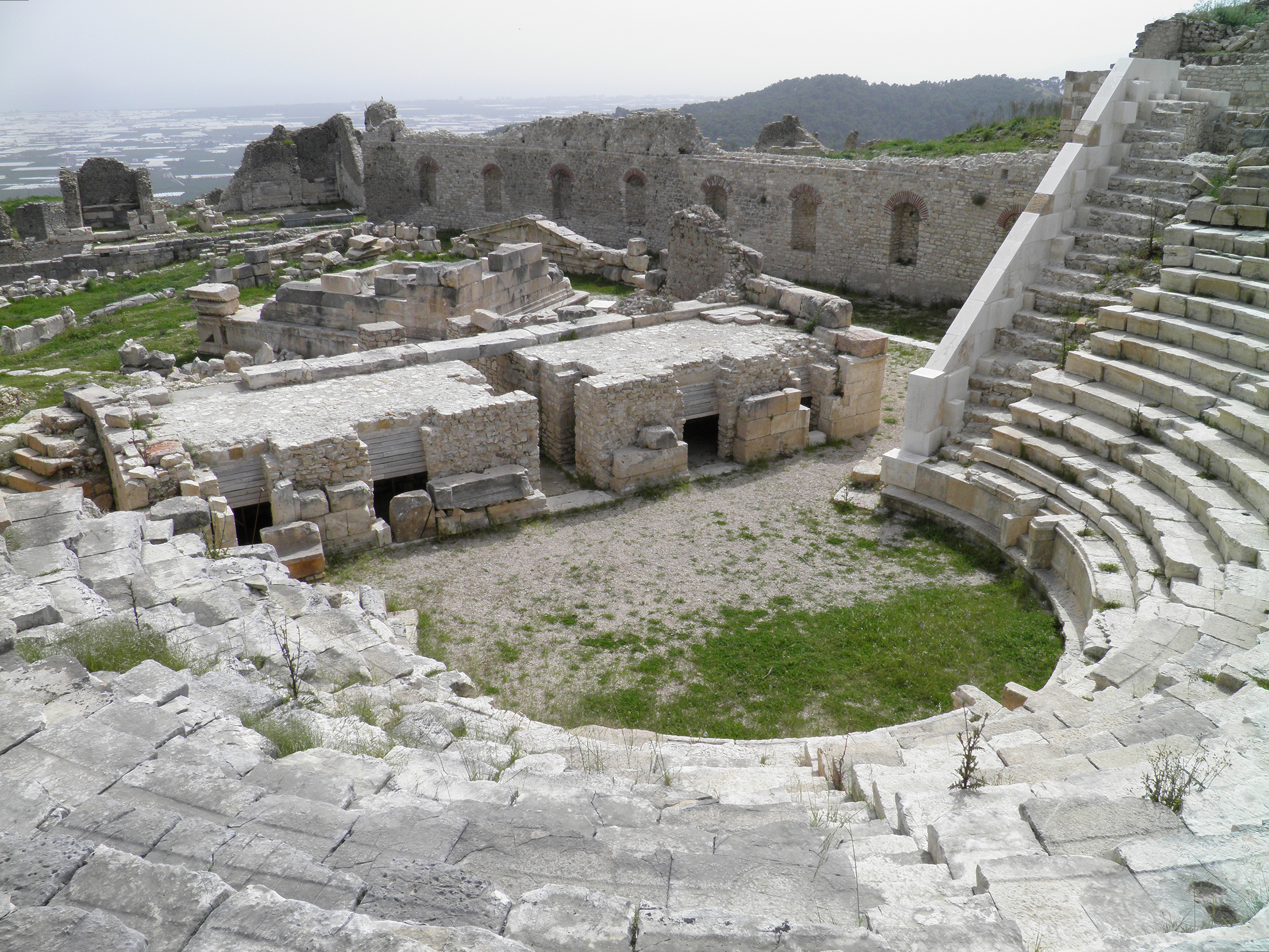
- Rhodiapolis theatre

- Location within Turkey
- 36°23′13″N 30°15′56″E
- Type: Settlement
- Associated with: Opramoas
- Location: Kumluca, Antalya Province, Turkey
- Region: Lycia

History
- Built by: Probably Rhodian colonists

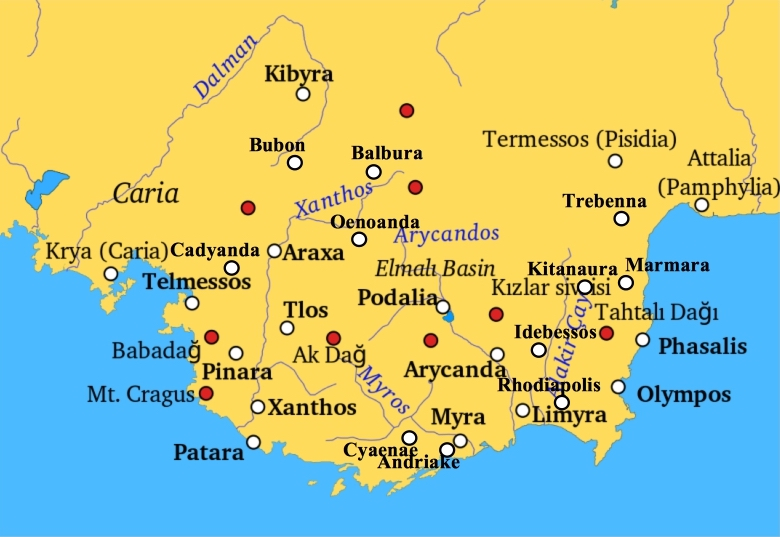
Cities of ancient Lycia

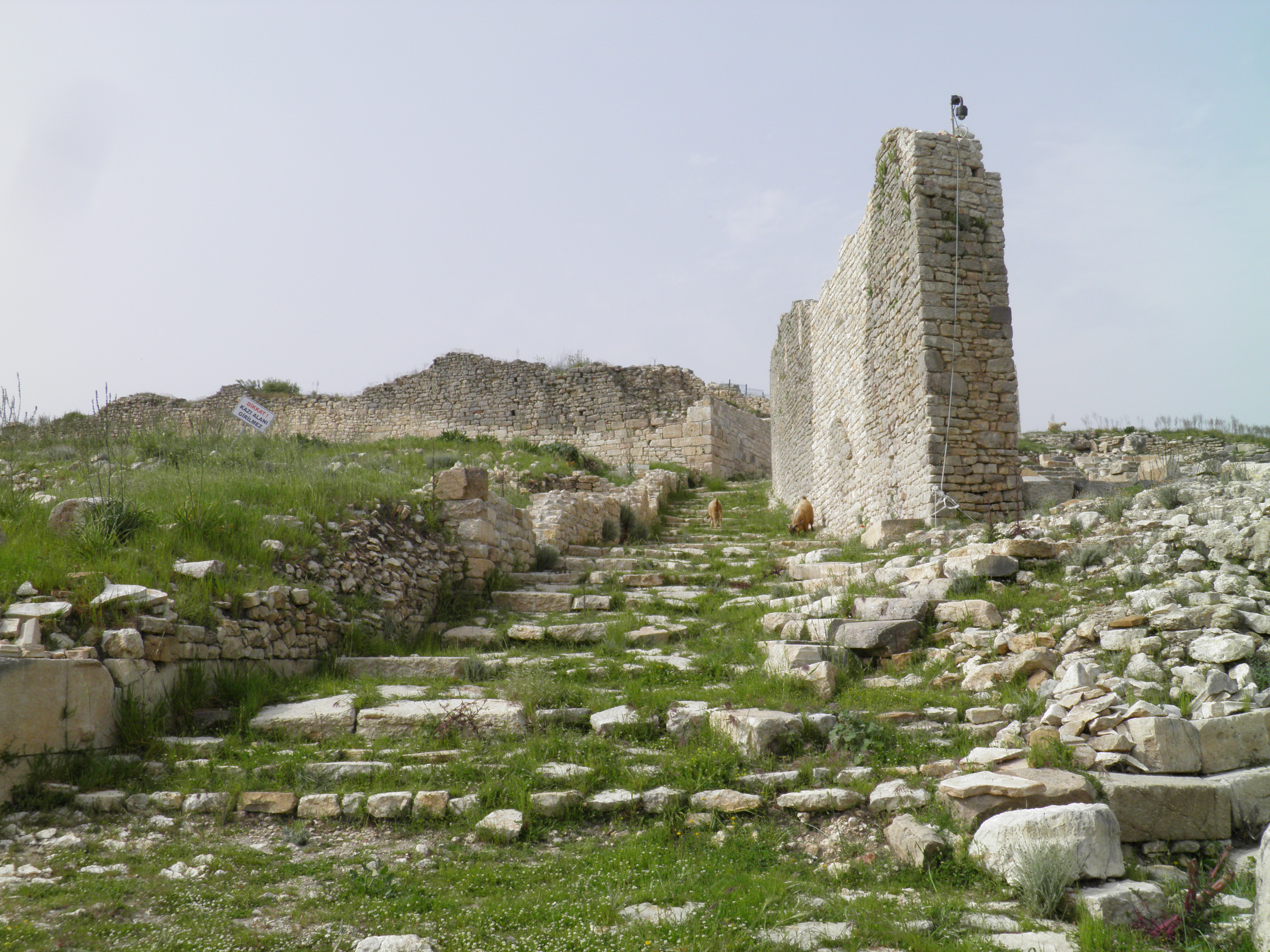
City Walls next to the theatre

Rhodiapolis (Ancient Greek: Ῥοδιάπολις), also known as Rhodia (Ῥοδία) and Rhodiopolis (Ῥοδιόπολις), was a city in ancient Lycia. Today it is located on a hill northwest of the modern town Kumluca in Antalya Province, Turkey.

Rhodiapolis stands out as a successfully planned, very compact Roman city in limited and difficult terrain with a uniquely intricate and packed layout of buildings without leaving empty space other than the streets. On the sloping terrain, terraces needed for urban fabric were formed mostly by cisterns, a clever solution that satisfied water demand while also creating flat areas for construction.

== History ==
It is called Rhodia by Ptolemy (V, 3) and Stephanus Byzantius; Rhodiapolis on its coins and inscriptions; Rhodiopolis by Pliny the Elder, who locates it in the mountains to the north of Corydalla. The city was considered to have been founded by colonists from Rhodes; the name Rhodiapolis means Rhodian City in English.

Rhodiapolis was a relatively small city in the Lycian League with only one vote, but did have the right to mint coins. Hellenistic finds in excavations belonging to monuments and particularly inscriptions and coins are definitive but comparatively few suggesting that the settlement at that time was small compared with the later Roman settlement. Due to the compact city area, most older buildings were overbuilt by later Roman ones and the theatre’s cavea is the sole remaining monument that dates to the late Hellenistic period.

In the Roman period the city became famous for being the home of the rich philanthropist Opramoas. A monument was constructed in his memory close to the city's theatre. On the monument's walls is the longest inscription in Lycia, commemorating his benefactions and the numerous honors bestowed on him. According to these, Opramoas donated approximately 500,000 denarii to 28 cities in Lycia to repair the damage caused by an earthquake between 140 and 143 AD. He also funded the construction of two temples at Rhodiapolis. Heraclitus was another famous resident, known for his oratory and knowledge of medicine.

According to inscriptions the city was a centre for the cult of Athena Polias during the Hellenistic and Roman period.

=== Ecclesiastical history ===
Rhodiapolis was in the late Roman province of Lycia and so its episcopal see was a suffragan of Myra, the metropolitan see of that province. Only one bishop of Rhodiapolis is known, Nicholas, present in 518 at a Council of Constantinople. The Notitiae episcopatuum continue to mention the see as late as the 12th or 13th century.

== Excavation history ==
The city was discovered in 1842 by T. A. B. Spratt. The first visual documentation and detailed investigations of the Opramoas inscriptions were completed by a team led by E. Krickl in 1894. The site was damaged by a large forest fire in 2005. The first excavation campaign at Rhodiapolis was conducted in 2006 on behalf of the Ministry of Culture and Tourism and Akdeniz University under the leadership of Nevzat Çevik.

== The Site ==
There are 2 thermal baths in the city. The extensive Large Baths dating from the 2nd century cover an area of 1077 m^{2} and have been excavated. They are remote from the city centre, at the foot of the hill as when it was built no room was left elsewhere for baths of this size, and water could be supplied here at the highest pressure. The southern half of the complex comprises the palaestra which covers 58% of the entire area. The cisterns below form the substructure/terrace of the palaestra on the sloping hillside. The east wall stands to its full height to the level of the vault. The caldarium, tepidarium and frigidarium had windows facing the palaestra on the south, thus profiting from the daylight and sun's heat. The baths had several phases of construction and after revision in the Roman period, radical alterations took piace in the Byzantine period.

The small baths dating from after the 4th century are located northeast of the large baths and are the most distant building from the town centre. Their location may have been determined by the stream that still flows today.

The agora, two-story stoa and the Opramoas stoa are also important monuments.

The remains of a small theatre, a temple of Asclepius, sarcophagi, and churches are still visible on the site. In 2011 a Lycian cemetery complex was discovered, dating from approximately 300 BC.

No aqueduct fed water to the city and it relied solely on water storage in cisterns. The so-called “aqueduct piers” that were once identified in fact belong to Roman chamber tombs.

The restoration of the temple near the theatre in 2017 was criticised for employing workers with no experience in restoration, lacking an experienced project manager, placing some stones backwards or in the wrong place, and excessively using Italian marble in place of existing stone.

== Gallery ==
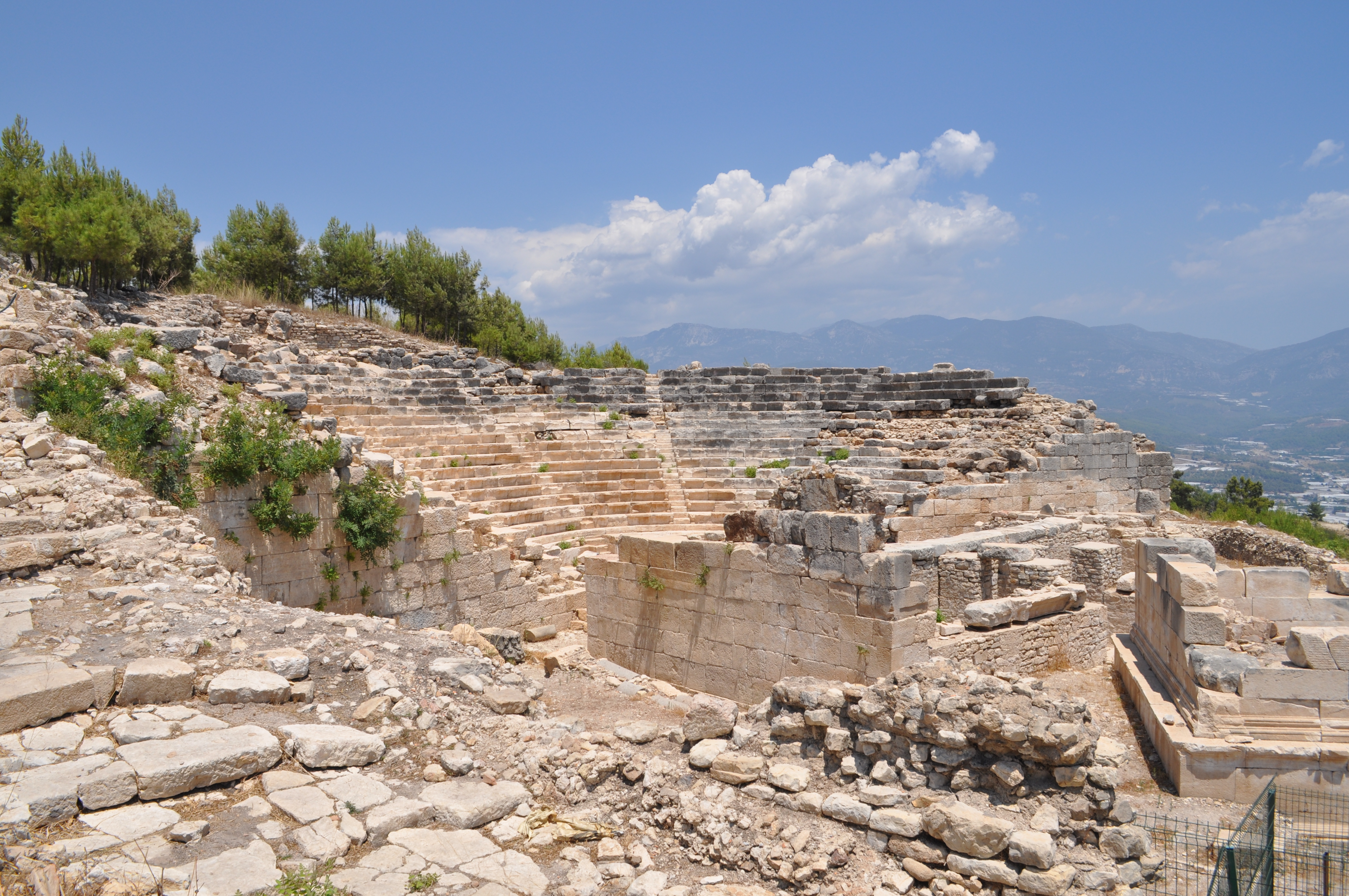
Theatre

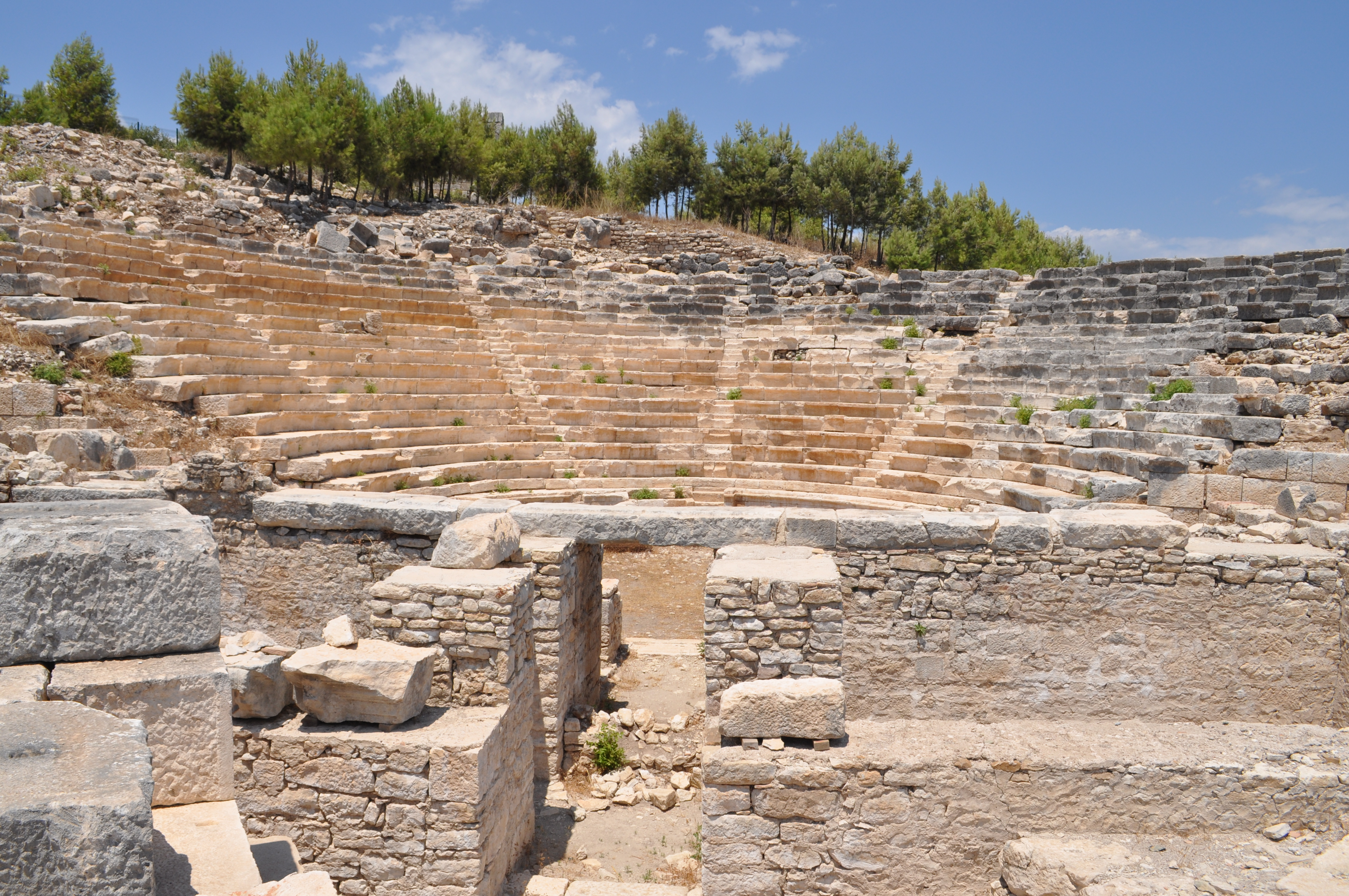
Theatre

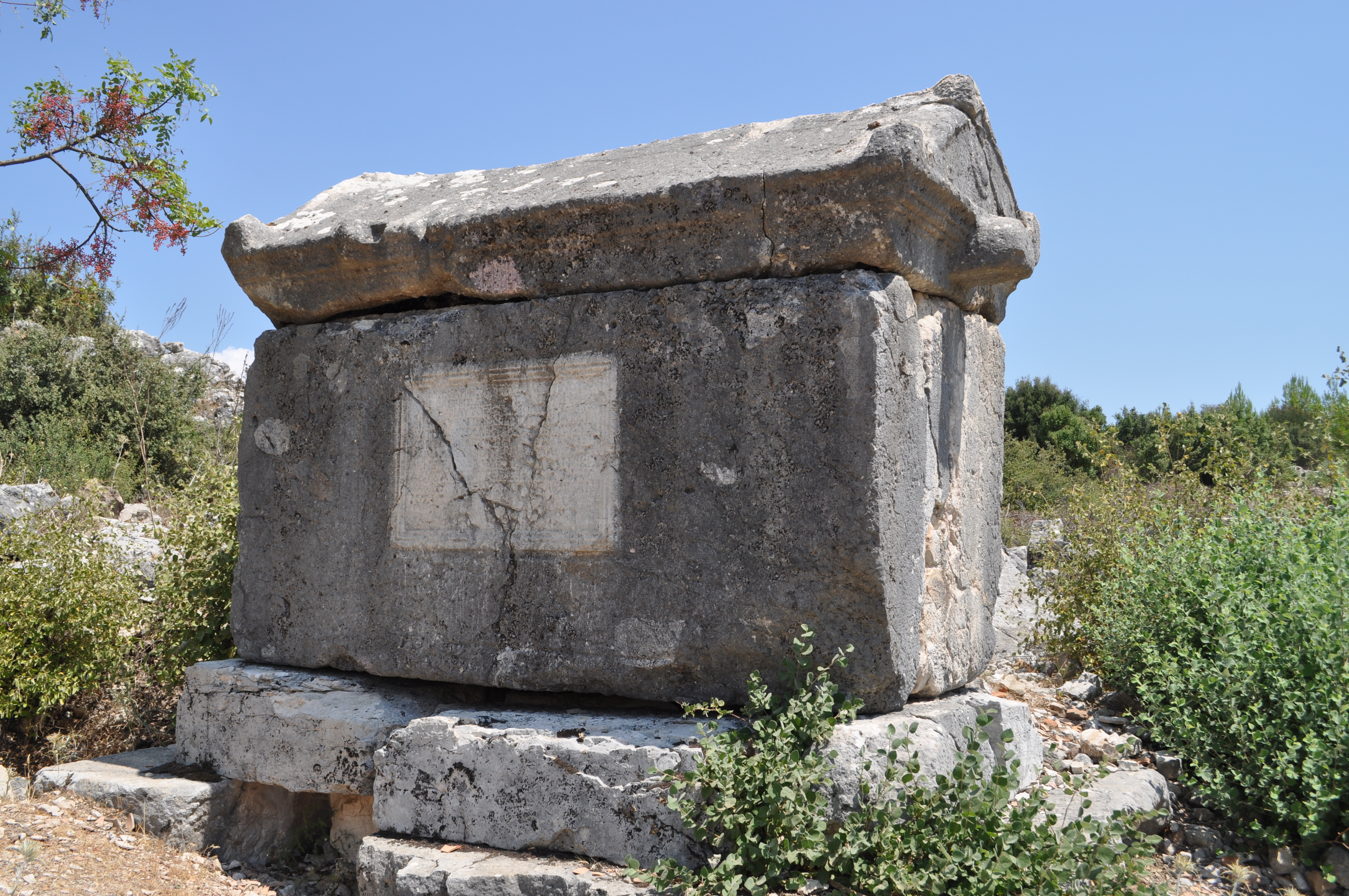
Lycian sarcophagus

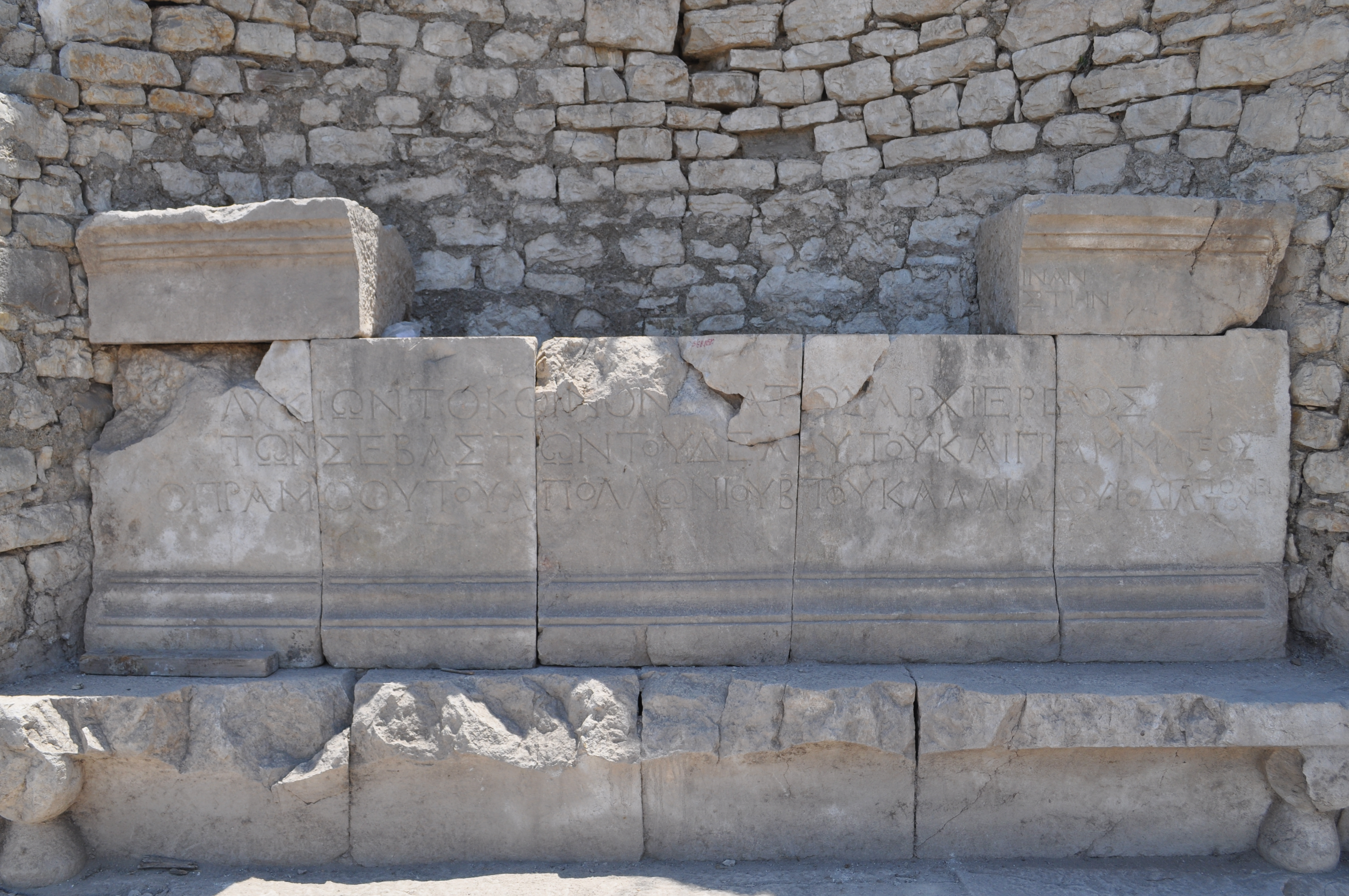
Inscription in honour of Opramoas
