= Krumau =

Krumau is the German name for two towns in the Czech Republic:

- Český Krumlov (Krumau an der Moldau / Böhmisch Krumau, Krummau)
- Moravský Krumlov (Mährisch Kromau)

Krumau is also the name of two locations in Austria:

- Krumau, a township of the municipality of Admont in Lower Austria
- the municipality Krumau am Kamp in Lower Austria

== See also ==
- Krumlov (disambiguation)
