= Umar Rolf von Ehrenfels =

Austrian anthropologist (1901–1980)

Baron Umar Rolf von Ehrenfels (born 28 April 1901 in Prague - died 7 February 1980 in Neckargemünd, Heidelberg, Germany) was a prominent Muslim of Austrian origin.

== Life outline ==
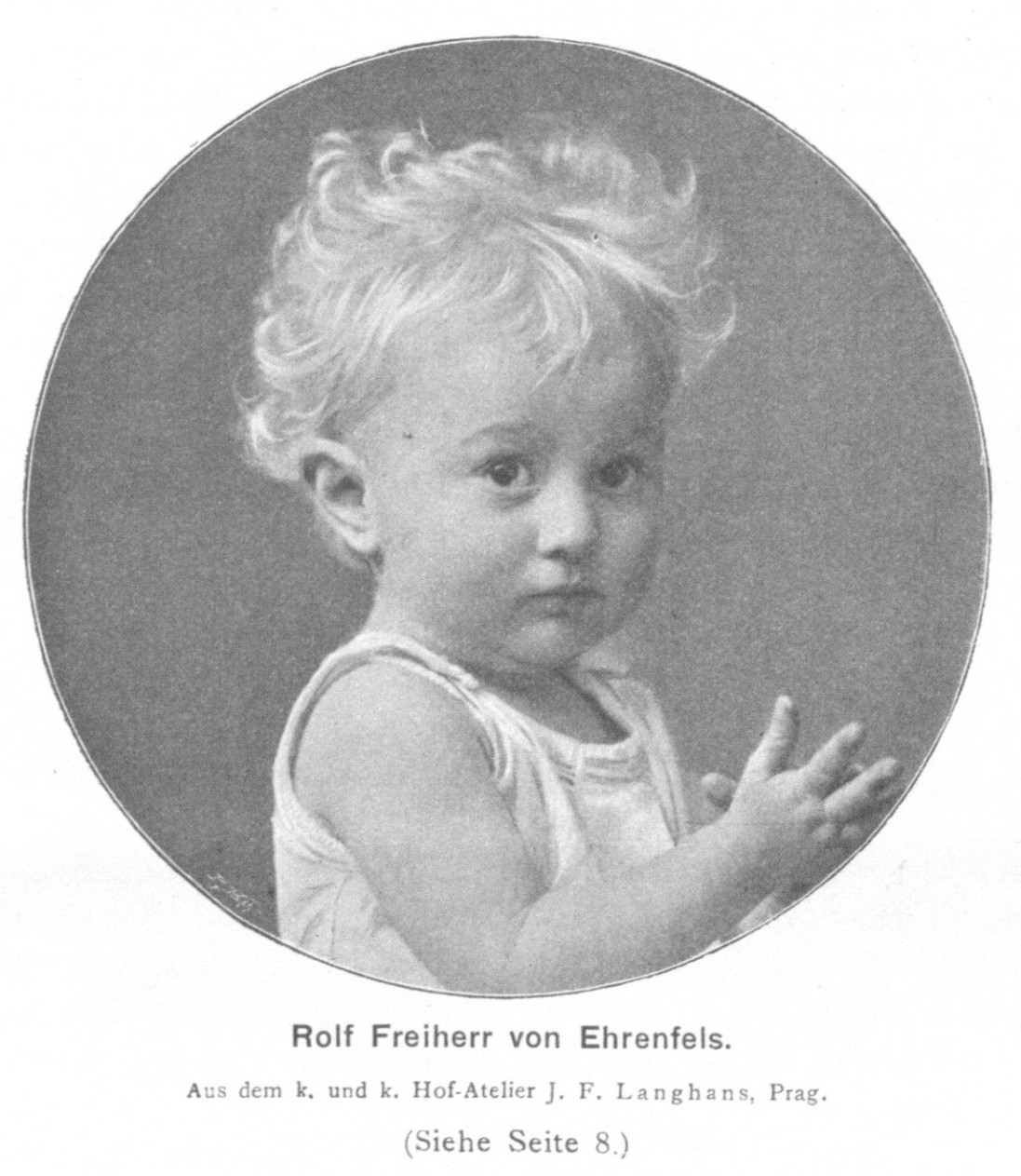
Rolf von Ehrenfels as a child, 1903

Omar, or as he later chose, Umar Rolf Ehrenfels was born 28 April 1901 in Prague, Bohemia, Austria-Hungary. He was baptised Rolf Werner Leopold von Ehrenfels. His father was the Roman Catholic Baron Christian von Ehrenfels (1859–1932), professor of philosophy at the German part of Prague University. He is known as the founder of the Gestalt theory. His mother was Emma von Ehrenfels (1862–1946; née André), a native of Bratislava (Pressburg). In her parental home both German and Hungarian was spoken. During World War I she worked for the Red Cross caring for Hungarian wounded soldiers. Widowed of her first marriage she brought her daughter Elfriede ("Elfi") Hartmann into their home. The second daughter, author Imma von Bodmershof (1895–1983), was born in Graz. Rolf as the only son of Christian Freiherr von Ehrenfels inherited the title but he had to discard it according to new Austrian laws in 1920. As a convert to Islam he took on the name Omar or Umar, kept Rolf and omitted the others. From 1932 to 1937, he was a student of social anthropology (Völkerkunde) at Vienna University and got a doctorate there.

At the Nazi occupation of Austria, Anschluss, 13 March 1938, he emigrated to India. There he lived until 1961, since 1949 as lecturer, later professor of social anthropology at the University of Madras. Umar Rolf Ehrenfels died on 7 February 1980, aged 78, in Neckargemuend, Germany having been guest professor at Heidelberg University and co- founder of its South Asia Institute 1961–71. Elfriede von Bodmershof (1894–1982) was his wife from 1925 to 1948. The couple was separated due to the Nazi occupation of 1938. Later, Ehrenfels married the French social scientist Mireille Abeille (1924–2007).

== Strong family ties ==
Rolf Ehrenfels was an Austrian citizen all his life. Lichtenau near Krems and Gföhl in Lower Austria was his home parish. Since 1813 the Ehrenfels family were settled in Schloss Lichtenau. Also the castles Brunn im Walde and Rastbach were family properties. Rolf's eldest sister Elfriede "Elfi" Hartmann married a widower with three children and had her own home from the early 1920s. His sister Imma Ehrenfels married Wilhelm "Willy" (von) Bodmershof (Schuster) and they settled at Rastbach castle for life. In 1925, there was a double wedding as Rolf Ehrenfels married Willy's sister, Fridl.

== Das grosse Sehnen ==
For a period Rolf lived in Berlin. His first wife Ellen Feld can be seen as she has a part in a film, Das grosse Sehnen, for which Rolf wrote the manuscript. Rolf and his friend, Willy Bodmershof, worked on it together and shot it partly in a studio in Berlin, partly on location in Istanbul in 1923. On this trip, partly by bicycle, Rolf's interest in Islam was kindled. Also, Christian von Ehrenfels appears in it, as a wise man. There are still photos in Ehrenfels archive, Lichtenau. The film is now in the Austrian Film Museum in Vienna.

The film was reviewed by Kurt Bauchwitz as press clippings in the Ehrenfels archive show. Kurt was one of the intellectual Jews in the Berlin Wilmersdorf area. With him Rolf Ehrenfels developed a friendship for life. Kurt called himself Roy C. Bates when he had escaped to the USA after 1933. Their relationship is documented in the Roy C Bates papers in the Grenander Collections at SUNY Albany, New York, USA.

== A European Muslim ==
Around 1926, Rolf made up his mind to convert to Islam. He took on the name Omar, used in his Muslim circles, Rolf in the family. (Later he turned a Sufist using different invented Sufi names.) In Berlin, Omar got attached to the Wilmersdorfer Mosque of Ahmadiyya Anjuman located in Brienner Strasse near Fehrbelliner Platz. Philosophy and religion were common interests to Rolf and his wife from 1925, Elfriede Ehrenfels. She contributed to academic journals of philosophy. She was never a Muslim, but was attracted by the Baháʼí Faith. Christian von Ehrenfels major work Kosmogonie (Jena 1916, English translation by M. Focht New York: Comet Press, 1948) fascinated them.

Together, Omar and Fridl made car tours in Muslim Europe, Bosnia and Albania, in 1929 and 1935. In 1931- 38 Omar wrote several important articles for the Berlin mosque journal started in 1924, Moslemische Revue, after he got a copy of it from the Imam Abdullah Effendi Kurbegovic (1873–1933) at the Great Mosque in Sarajevo. Living at Lichtenau Omar was one of the editorial board. He also wrote for Muslim Journals in English, connected to the Lahori Ahmadiyya e.g. at Woking. At his death in 1980, Umar Rolf was said to be the oldest Muslim by choice, "Wahlmuslim", in Europe. He wrote Muslim (Sufist) articles until the end (Sifat, Zurich, 1978).

== A passage to India 1932- 33 ==
In an attempt to overcome the grief at his beloved father's death Umar Rolf made a journey to India in 1932–33. Together with the Imam of the Wilmersdorfer Mosque in Berlin, former professor in Lahore Dr S.M. Abdullah, Baron Omar made a lecture tour from Lahore in the north to Hyderabad in the south as an advocate of the Ahmadiya movement. He sent reports from the tour printed in newspapers. At home again he lectured. The tour affected him so much that Umar Rolf decided to give his life a new turn. He made India his main life project. His interest was deep. His father's colleague the Indologist professor Moriz Winternitz (1863–1937) had taught Rolf as a boy. He had met high-ranking Indians in his home among them the Nobel Prize Laureate Rabindranath Tagore (1861–1941). Mahatma Gandhi's close man Vallabhbhai Patel (1875–1950) was the patron of Der Orientbund in Vienna, which Umar Rolf founded 1932 and presided until his escape to India 1938. What Ehrenfels saw of women's position on the tour 1932-33 made him choose to study social anthropology at Vienna University. In 1937 he got his doctorate with the dissertation "Mutterrecht in Vorderindien". It was translated by himself and published in Hyderabad/Dn in 1941 as "Mother-right in India".

== Refugee from Nazist Austria in British India ==
In 1938, Umar Rolf Ehrenfels lived in Vienna. He was known as a convert to Islam and founding president of the multiracial students' society in Vienna called Der Orientbund or Islamischer Kulturbund. His doctoral dissertation of 1937 built on a strongly anti- Aryan theory. As an active anti- fascist Umar Rolf had to flee to save his life after the Nazi occupation of Austria 13 March 1938. His wife Elfriede did not want to leave Austria. Rolf tried to protect her from harassment by a divorce in 1938, which was denied.

Franz Kafka's friend and biographer Max Brod (1884–1968) was editor of Prager Tageblatt that had published many texts by Rolf. Brod managed to warn Rolf, who was lecturing in Prague, not to go back to Vienna, where he was on the Nazi death list. In 1939 Brod fled to Tel Aviv. He stayed in contact with Umar Rolf for life. They were engaged in JCM, an organisation to near the three religions. This was a recurrent theme of the Moslemische revue from 1924 on. Ehrenfels left his home by way of Greece trying to find solutions. His wife went with him and friends came to support him. Thanks to Sir Akbar Hydari (1869–1941), in 1939 Umar could escape to be a guest of The Nizam of Hyderabad Deccan in South India. Motherright in India has a printed dedication saying: "To Sir Akbar Hydari, the Chancellor of the Osmania University, the distinguished promoter of science and learning in India." According to plans Ehrenfels was to become professor of a new department of anthropology but a Nazi party member from Vienna came in his way. One trace of this plan is Ilm-ul Aqam. It is anthropological textbook for students in two volumes translated from Ehrenfels' manuscript in English into Urdu by Dr. Syed Abid Hussain.

A letter to Max Brod (1941) says: "General and Indian Ethnology for the layman". The situation in India changed at the outbreak of World War II September 1939. Austrian passports were considered "German" from March 1938. The war meant that antifascist refugee Umar Rolf Ehrenfels was now an "enemy alien". Ehrenfels was deprived of his liberty until 1946 in two British India internment camps most of the time at Yercaud, a hill station. He managed to do some anthropological fieldwork - under police escort. He learnt languages and created art as he was a painter, having his first exhibitions in Prague and Vienna.

== Respected in India .. and East Africa ==
In 1949, Ehrenfels lectured before the Indian Prime Minister Jawaharlal Nehru (1889–1964) and got an honorary Indian citizenship. He was awarded the Sarat Chandra Roy Golden Medal for original contributions to Anthropology by the Royal Asiatic Society of Bengal. Ehrenfels had suffered hardships as a British Empire political prisoner like other freedom fighters. A forced exile had brought him back as the Nizam's guest but he became an active builder of the new republic. He used anthropology with a historical and interdisciplinary outlook to strengthen the self-esteem of Indians particularly women. He wrote many anthropological articles and gave radio talks. He took part in social work. Always infused with his passion for women's rights, not only in theory but in implementation in real life.

In 1949–61, Ehrenfels was head and professor of the Department of Anthropology, founded in 1945, at Madras University. He held several grants from the Viking Fund, New York and did field work reinforcing the theories he had presentad in his dissertation 1937. In 1957–58, he held a Swedish grant to make his longed for field work in East Africa, described in the book The Light Continent (1960), translated into German and Telugu: Kaanti Seema.

== Back in Europe ==
From Madras, Ehrenfels and his wife, Mireielle, moved to Heidelberg in 1961. Together they went to do a last fieldwork in India in the mid 60s. Apart from a book in 1969 there is a great amount of unpublished material in the Lichtenau archive. After her husband's death Mireille Ehrenfels made Lichtenau her home. She made great efforts in restoring the Lichtenau and Rastbach castles after the damages during the war as well as organising the Ehrenfels Archive.

== Dress codes ==
A recurrent theme in Ehrenfels' writings from the early 1920s was dress codes and women's rights. Ehrenfels insisted that both men and women should stick to the pre- colonial traditions of the tropics which was to leave the upper part of the body uncovered. Ehrenfels lived as he taught and adjusted his dress to the climate but he could only do so in private. In British India there was legislation punishing non- indigenous men for "disgracing European dignity" by wearing the dhoti.

In 1973, the International Anthropological and Ethnological Congress IUAES was held in Chicago presided by Professor Sol Tax (1907–1995). Tax's paper, Clothing and Power Abuse, was printed in two of the congress volumes. 1975 in War: Its Causes and Correlates. Part 2: Psychological and psychiatric considerations of the etiology of war pp. 157-61. 1979 in The Fabrics of Culture: The Anthropology of Clothing and Adornment, pp. 399-404. Tax presented the 1973 congress in Chicago as the first of the decolonization era and demanded peace research to be a worldwide commitment ever after. The next IUAES congress in 1978 was for the first time held in the third world, in New Delhi, India, presided by Lalita Prasad Vidyarthi (1931–1985).

== Texts available in context thanks to digitisation ==
He appears both in the aspect as a Muslim and Islamologist and as a Vienna University trained professional social scientist working at Madras University (1949–61) and Heidelberg University (1961 – c. 1975) doing scientific, published fieldwork in South Asia 1932–1964. The World Catalog http://worldcat.org database, although only primary, leads to several titles. Most of Ehrenfels' articles written for the Moslemische Revue in Berlin can now be read here. This is the only genuine journal published in by the Berlin Mosque. The name was taken by others later. Umar Rolf Ehrenfels is included in the book Islam Our Choice first edition May 1961 is online here.

Ehrenfels expressed his Muslim faith as it had crystallized over the years in the article "The How and Why of Conversion to Islam", published in June 1961 in the Islamic Review Woking. A fact box contains his life story. In 1967, the article was translated into German published in the Al Muslim, Frankfurt/M. By that time, Ehrenfels' work at Heidelberg University's South Asia Institute as a guest professor employed as a senior research fellow Ehrenfels had made him move even further.

After his escape from the Nazis in Austria after March 1938, Ehrenfels was received as a guest of Nizam's government thanks to Sir Akbar Hydari. In 1939, Ehrenfels wrote "Indian and general anthropology for the layman", a two volume textbook for the students of anthropology he was planned to have at the Osmania University in Hyderabad. It was translated into Urdu, the educational language of the university, as Ilmul Aqvam.

== Works and publications ==
=== Published material ===
1. Omar or Umar Rolf Ehrenfels, 1923–1978. The bibliography of printed works contains over 300 numbers, made up by Siv Hackzell 1994–2012, not yet published. Books:
  1. 1941. Motherright in India. Introduction by W. Koppers. 229 p. Ill. Revised transl. of Ph.D. diss. Hyderabad-Deccan: Oxford Univ. Press in Osmania Univ. series. Reviews in Internet.
  2. 1942. Ilmul Aqvam. Vol. 1–2. An anthropological textbook for students translated from URE's manuscript in English into Urdu by Dr. Syed Abid Hussain. Delhi: Anjuman Taraqqi-Urudu. Digitised in 2010. External link.http://oudl.osmania.ac.in
  3. 1952. Kadar of Cochin. Tribal monograph. Preface P.W. Schmidt. Ill. University of Madras Anthropological Series No 1. Reviews n Internet.
  4. 1960. The Light Continent. Bombay, London, New York: Asia Publishing House. Reviews in Internet. Translations:
  5. 1962. Im lichten Kontinent: Erfahrungen eines Ethnologen in Ostafrika. Translated by Dr. H. Venedey. Register by URE & M.S. Gopalakrishnan. Darmstadt: Progress Verlag.
  6. 1963. Kaanti Seema. Translated into Telugu by Smt. Ramalakshimi Arudra. Madras/ Machilipatnam/ Secunderabad: M. Seshachalam & Co.
  7. 1969. Innere Entwicklungshilfe: eine ethnologische Studie in Südindien. Schriftenreihe des Südasien-Instituts der Univ. Heidelberg.
2. Leela Ehrenfels, 2004. Reader's Forum: Ali & Nino Copyright in Azerbaijan International, Vol. 12:4 (Winter 2004), pp 10 ff.
3. Eric Germain & Nathalie Clayer eds, 2008. Islam in Inter-War Europe. New York: Columbia University Press. See google books
  1. Eric Germain, 2008. "The First Muslim Missions on a European Scale: Ahmadi-Lahori Networks in the Inter-War Period" pp. 89–127 in Germain- Clayer eds. Chapter also printed in The Light- Islamic Review, Lahore 2009/ 1–2.
4. Siv Hackzell, 2011. Umar Rolf Ehrenfels: Mother-right Anthropologist of The "Vienna School" in the Cultural Triangle Europe- India- East Africa. BA- thesis at Stockholm University, Department of Social Anthropology. Copy also in the Royal/ National Library.
5. Gerhard Hoepp.
  1. 1997. Mohammad Essad Bey: nur Orient fuer Europaeer? in Asien Afrika Lateinamerika, Berlin, Vol. 25:1, pp. 75–97.
  2. 2002. Wer schrieb Ali und Nino?. Zur Archaeologie einer Legende in Zenith: Zeitschrift für den Orient, Hamburg, no 2 pp. 59–61.
6. Karl Jettmar, 1980. Umar Rolf von Ehrenfels (1901–1980) in Mitteilungen der Anthropologischen Gesellschaft in Wien CX Band S. 199- 201.
7. Tom Reiss.
  1. 1999. The Man from the East in The New Yorker p. 68-83.
  2. 2005. The Orientalist. Solving the Mystery of a Strange and Dangerous Life New York: Random House.
8. Ferdinand Weinhandl, ed. 1960. Gestalthaftes Sehen. Ergebnisse und Aufgaben der Morphologie. Zum 100-jährigen Geburtstag von Christian v. Ehrenfels. Darmstadt: Wissenschaftliche Buchgesellschaft.
9. Lalita Prasad Vidyarthi, 1978. Rise of anthropology in India: a social science orientation. Volym 1. Delhi: Naurang Rai. NB Writes Ehrenfel/Ehrenfel's. See Google books.
10. Azerbaijan International, Vol. 15:2-4 (2011). Edited by Betty Blair. "Who Wrote Azerbaijan's Most Famous Novel: Ali and Nino. The Business of Literature". Two separate volumes, in English and in Azeri, 364 pages, approximately 1200 photos.

=== Unpublished documents ===
1. Documents in the Ehrenfels archive at Lichtenau that Siv Hackzell organised and worked with 1994, 1995 and 1998 for a biography of UR Ehrenfels. Mireille Ehrenfels in 1998 gave Tom Reiss access to this material. He used it for his article in the New Yorker 1999 extended into his book 2005.
2. Copies of some of the documents in the Ehrenfels archive can be found in the Roy C Bates papers at the Grenander Collections, Albany. Ehrenfels and Kurt Bauchwitz stayed in contact by writing letters, from 1939 on, preserved in the archive. It also has copies of Ehrenfels' prints.
3. The Women's History Collections in Gothenburg, Sweden has letters and copies of prints.
