= Ava (poet) =

Medieval German poet

The poet Ava (c. 1060 – 7 February 1127), also known as Frau Ava, Ava of Göttweig or Ava of Melk, was the first named female writer in any genre in the German language. She is the author of five poems which focus on Christian themes of salvation and the second coming of Christ. Her work on the lives of John the Baptist and Jesus "has been praised as the first German epic". Her simple rhyming couplets made complex biblical teachings accessible in the vernacular.

== Life ==
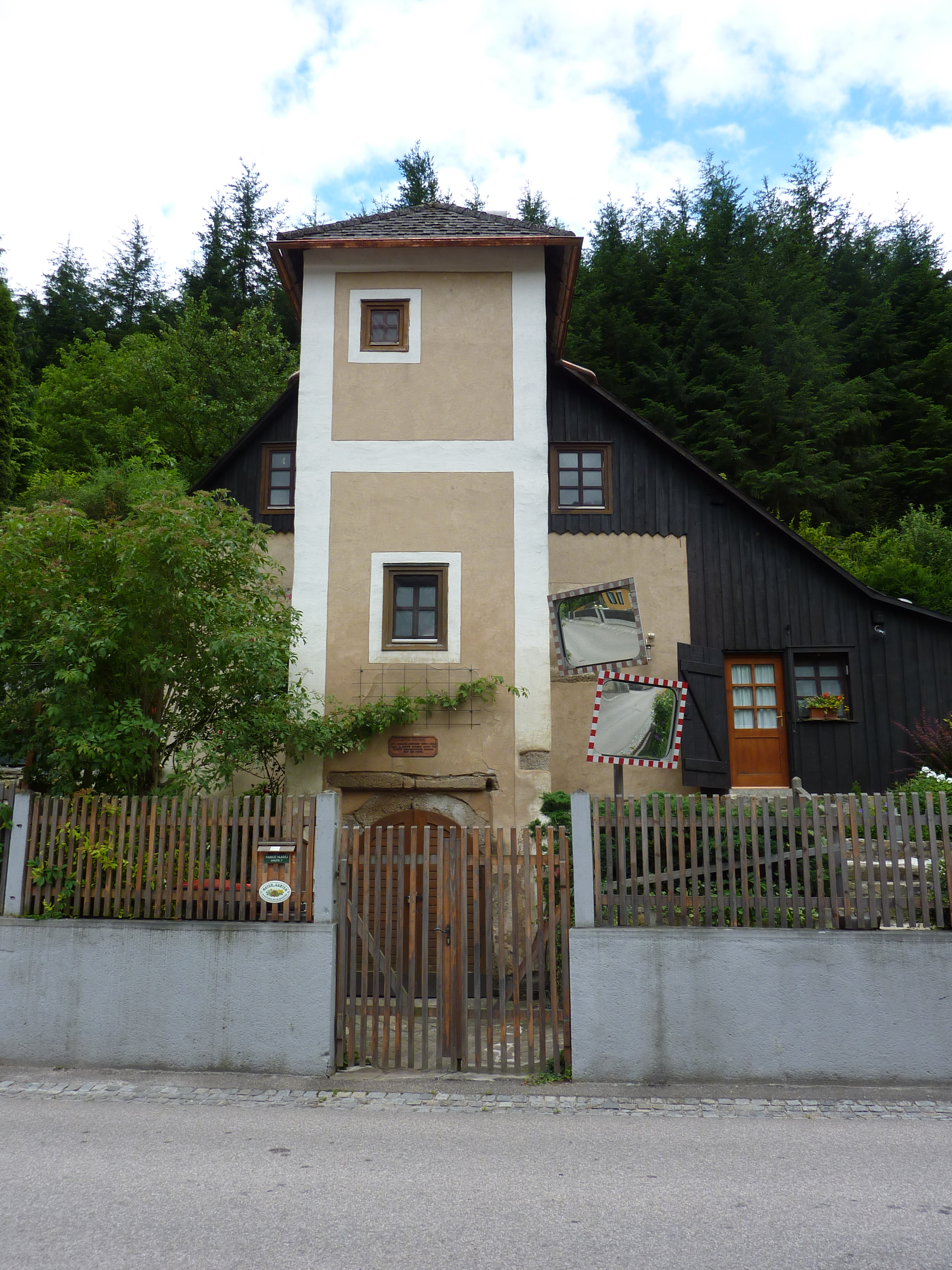
Ava's Tower in Klein-Wien

Little is known about the life of Ava beyond her work and some references to her identity as an anchorite (anchoress). It is known that she was married and bore two sons who are mentioned in the afterword of her poem posthumously named Das Jüngste Gericht (The Last Judgement). Through this afterword we also learn that one of Ava's sons died within her lifetime, though the age at which he died and the cause of death are not stated.

Due to her vast knowledge of scripture, most scholars identify Ava the poet with a certain Ava whose death is recorded in a number of monasteries in Austria. It is likely that after the death of her husband, Ava lived as an enclosed woman on the estate of Göttweig Abbey in Lower Austria, near Krems, or perhaps in Melk Abbey.

In Klein-Wien near Göttweig there remains still today a tower called "Ava's Tower" (Avaturm), possibly the remains of the earlier nunnery. It seems likely that the church of Saint Blaise in Klein-Wien stands on the site of the little chapel that existed at the time of Ava.

Until recently, Ava was usually referred to as "Frau Ava." The convention at least in English-speaking scholarship has changed since the appearance of the Rushing edition, which pointed out that the title "Frau" sounds patronising when male poets of the period are not called "Herr Wolfram" etc.

== Works ==
Four untitled poems attributed to Ava are found in the Vorauer Manuscript dated 1150. These four poems are seen again, with the addition of a fifth detailing the life of John the Baptist, in a fourteenth-century manuscript found in the town of Gorlitz. Ava is credited with these five poems due to their appearance together in these early manuscripts along with the poem, later titled Das Jüngste Gericht (The Last Judgement), in whose afterward Ava is named as Author. All five poems resemble one another in style, grammar, and theme, leading scholars to believe that they were indeed penned by the same hand.

Though writing in the vernacular, Ava displays an apt ability to convey great meaning in simple measure. The wide array of images that appear in her poetry point to a deep understanding of Christian theology as well as a vast pool of sources from which she found inspiration. She is able to weave together various narratives found in the Gospels in a way that displays her mastery of the material while creating a distinct voice for herself. In her poetry Ava uses the Commentaries of Bede, Rabanus Maurus and Alcuin, Adso's Libellus de Antichristo (or his Latin source) and other works. The poems all centre on themes of salvation and the end of the Catholic Church as detailed in Revelation. Like most composers of medieval biblical epics, she incorporates many ideas and motifs belonging to the so-called Medieval popular Bible, motifs which were popular in her time, and remain popular into ours - such as the ox and the ass at the crib - which are in fact not to be found in the Bible itself. She also adds content from the Apocrypha.

- "Johannes" ("John the Baptist")
- "Leben Jesu" ("Jesus, The Son of God") with a final section on "Die 7 Gaben des Heiligen Geistes" ("The Seven Gifts of the Holy Spirit") (Vorau Manuscript)
- "Antichrist" (Vorau Manuscript)
- "Das Jüngste Gericht" ("The Last Judgment") (Vorau Manuscript)
- The Seven Gifts of The Holy Spirit

== Frau Ava Literature Prize ==
A biennial literary prize known as the Frau Ava Literaturpreis was instituted in 2001 by the towns of Paudorf und Furth bei Göttweig and first awarded in 2003, open to works by already published female writers in German on spiritual, religious or political topics aimed at, or appealing to, a youth readership.
