= Venus of Galgenberg =

Aurignacian-era Venus figurine

- Venus vom Galgenberg (German)
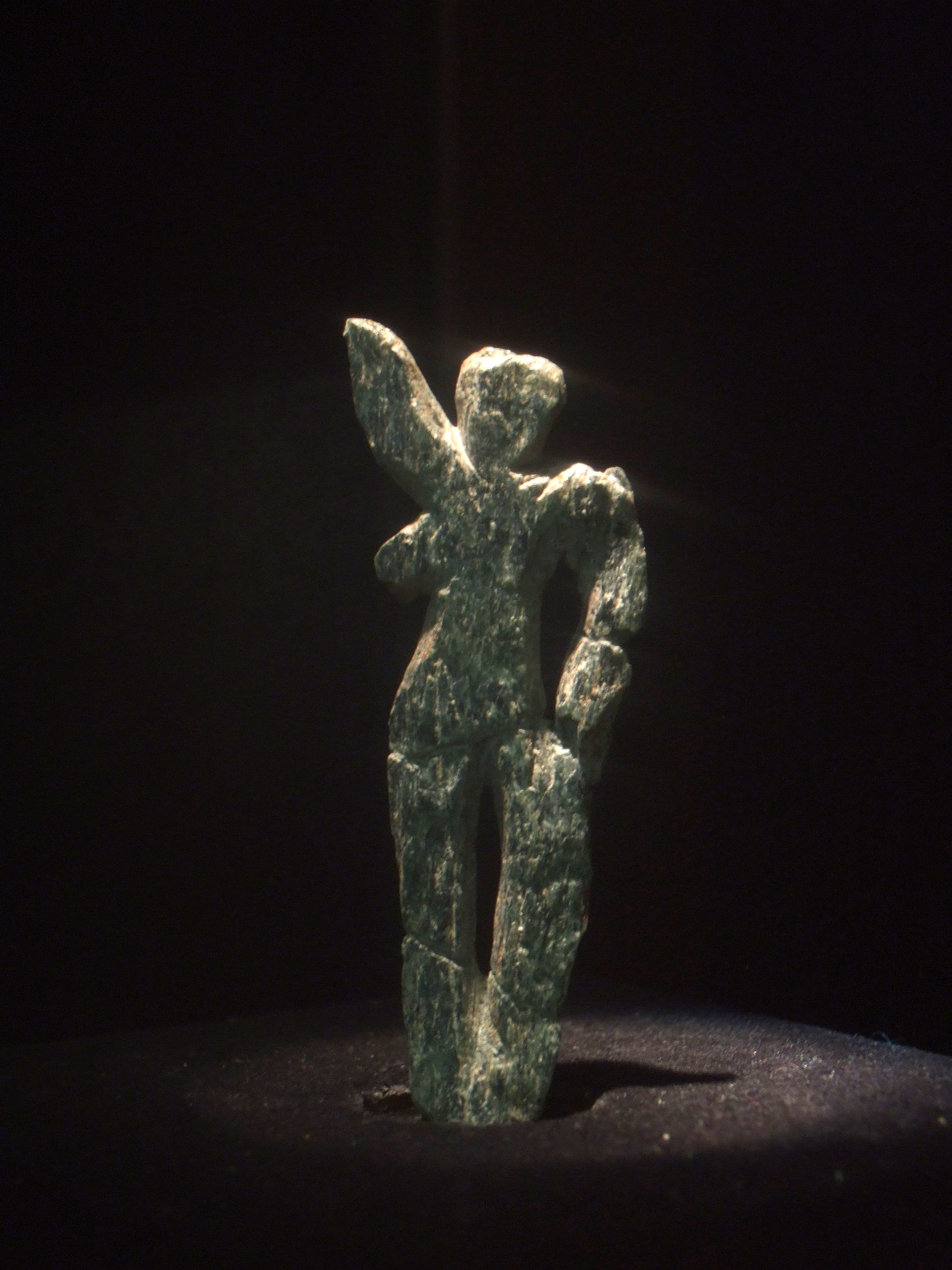
- Year: c. 36,000 years ago
- Medium: Serpentine group stone
- Subject: A woman
- Dimensions: 7.2 cm (2.8 in)
- Location: Naturhistorisches Museum, Vienna, Austria

The Venus of Galgenberg is a Venus figurine of the Aurignacian era, dated about 36,000 years ago. The sculpture, also known in German as the Fanny von Galgenberg, was discovered in 1988 close to Stratzing, Austria, not far from the site of the Venus of Willendorf. The two statuettes are normally displayed in the same cabinet at the Museum of Natural History in Vienna, to emphasise the special nature of these two "old ladies", as the curator affectionately calls them.

The figurine measures 7.2 centimetres (2.8 in) in height and weighs 10 grams (0.35 oz). It is sculpted from shiny green serpentine rock which is found in the immediate vicinity of where the figurine was unearthed.

Because the figurine exhibits a "dancing pose" it was given the nickname "Fanny" after Fanny Elssler, an Austrian ballerina of the 19th century.

== Literature ==
- Das neolithische Fundmaterial von St.Pölten/Galgenleithen. in: Mitteilungen der Anthropologischen Gesellschaft in Wien. Wien 108.1978, 50ff. ISSN 0373-5656
- Zur altsteinzeitlichen Besiedlungsgeschichte des Galgenberges von Stratzing/Krems - Rehberg. in: Archäologie Österreichs. Mitteilungen der Österreichischen Gesellschaft für Ur- und Frühgeschichte. Bd 18. Wien 4.1993,1,10 ff. ISSN 1018-1857
- Bednarik, Robert (1989) The Galgenberg figurine from Krems, Austria. Rock Art Research. 6. 118-25

== See also ==
- List of Stone Age art
- Art of the Upper Paleolithic
