= Antonio della Porta =

Swiss architect

- Born: c. 1631; Manno, near Lugano
- Died: 1702; Bayreuth
- Occupations: Architect, master builder
- Style: Baroque

Antonio Porta, also known as Antonio della Porta (c. 1631 – 1702) was a Baroque architect and master builder from Manno, near Lugano. He worked for the Lobkowicz family in Bohemia, where his principal work was Roudnice Castle. He later entered the service of Christian Ernst, Margrave of Brandenburg-Bayreuth.

== Biography ==
Antonio della Porta was born around 1631 in Manno, near Lugano. He studied architecture in northern Italy and may also have trained in Vienna. Between 1662 and 1666, Porta was employed by Ferdinand von Verdenberg as an architect at Grafenegg in Lower Austria.

Around 1668, Porta settled in Bohemia and entered the service of Wenzel Eusebius of Lobkowicz. He later served Lobkowicz's son Ferdinand August and remained in their service until 1697. Between 1688 and 1690, Porta built Casa Porta in Manno as his family's principal house. From 1697, Porta worked for Christian Ernst, Margrave of Brandenburg-Bayreuth. He died in Bayreuth in 1702. Porta's bequest in Manno funded religious works and helped local young people pursue artistic studies in Rome.

== Work ==
In 1666, Porta was contracted to build a Loreto chapel beside the parish church at Strass im Strassertal. Roudnice Castle was his principal work for the Lobkowicz family. The enlargement was planned in 1672 around an earlier building constructed by Francesco Caratti between 1652 and 1665. Porta later continued the project after Caratti.

Porta built or remodelled several castles in Bohemia and Silesia, including Milešov, Červený Hrádek, Żagań, Bílina, Vysoký Chlumec, Lobkovice and Libochovice. In 1678, the pilgrimage church of St Quirin near Püchersreuth was built to Porta's plans under Ferdinand of Lobkowicz.

Construction of the Lobkowicz palace at Neustadt an der Waldnaab began in 1698. Porta designed it with Roudnice Castle as a model. The design envisaged three wings, but only one was built. Despite his employment at the Bayreuth court, Porta remained involved with the Neustadt project and supervised the work until his death in 1702.
