= Diamond jubilee =

60th anniversary of an event

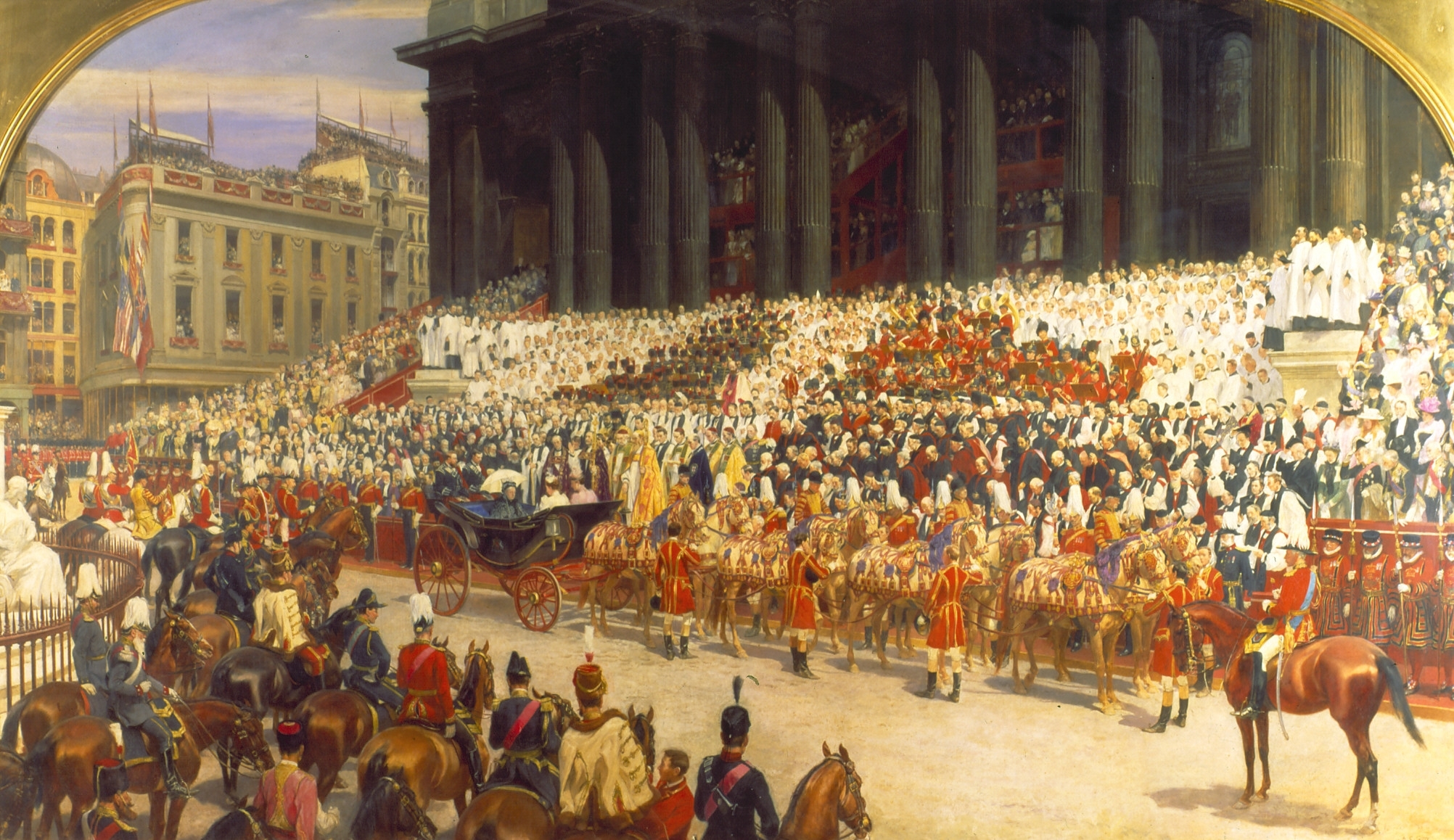
Queen Victoria's diamond jubilee service, 22 June 1897

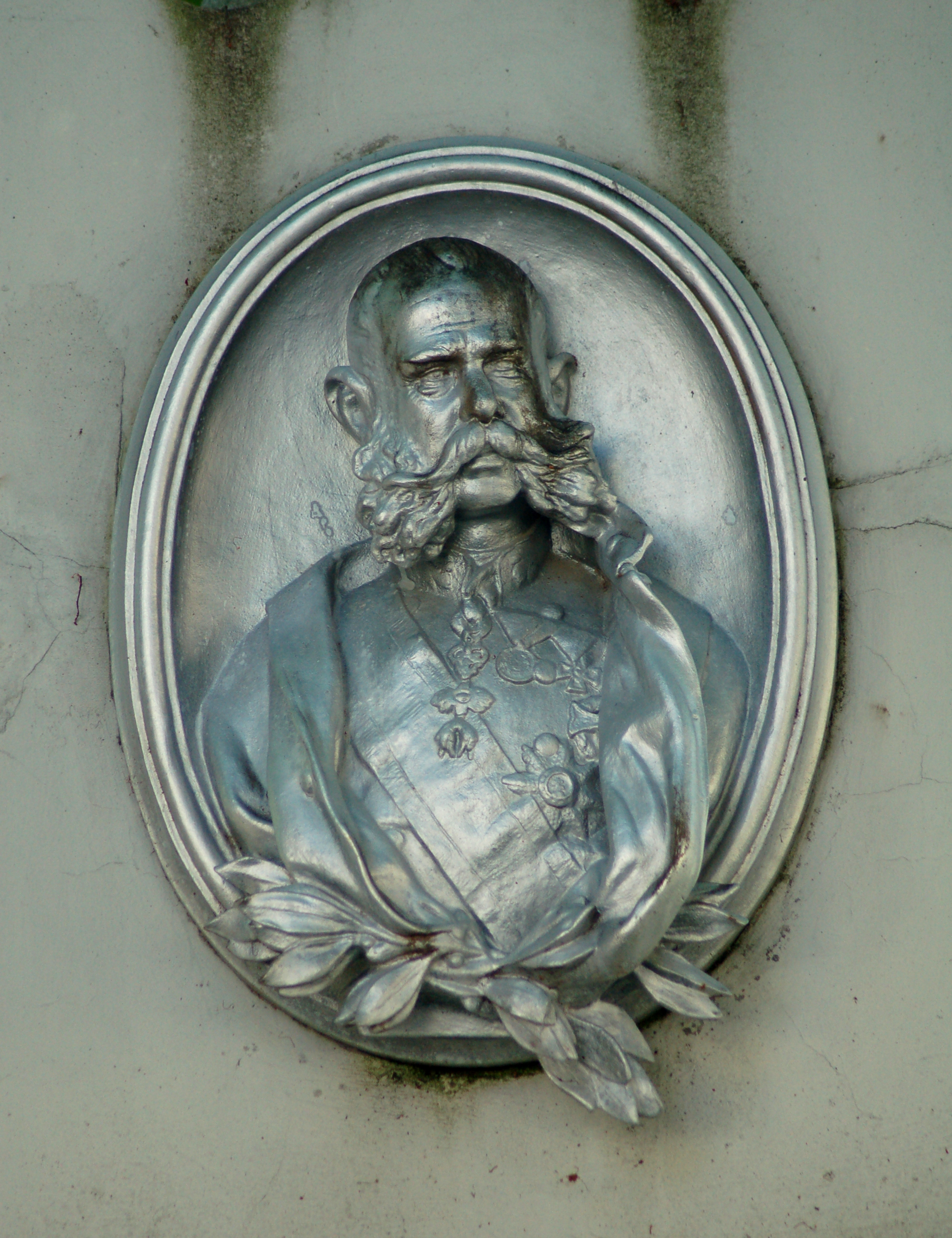
Monument in Krumau am Kamp remembering the 60th anniversary of Emperor Franz Joseph I's enthronement in 1908.

A diamond jubilee celebrates the 60th anniversary of a significant event related to a person (e.g. accession to the throne or wedding, among others) or the 60th anniversary of an institution's founding. The term is also used for 75th anniversaries, although the human lifespan makes this usage more common for institutions.

== Western monarchies ==
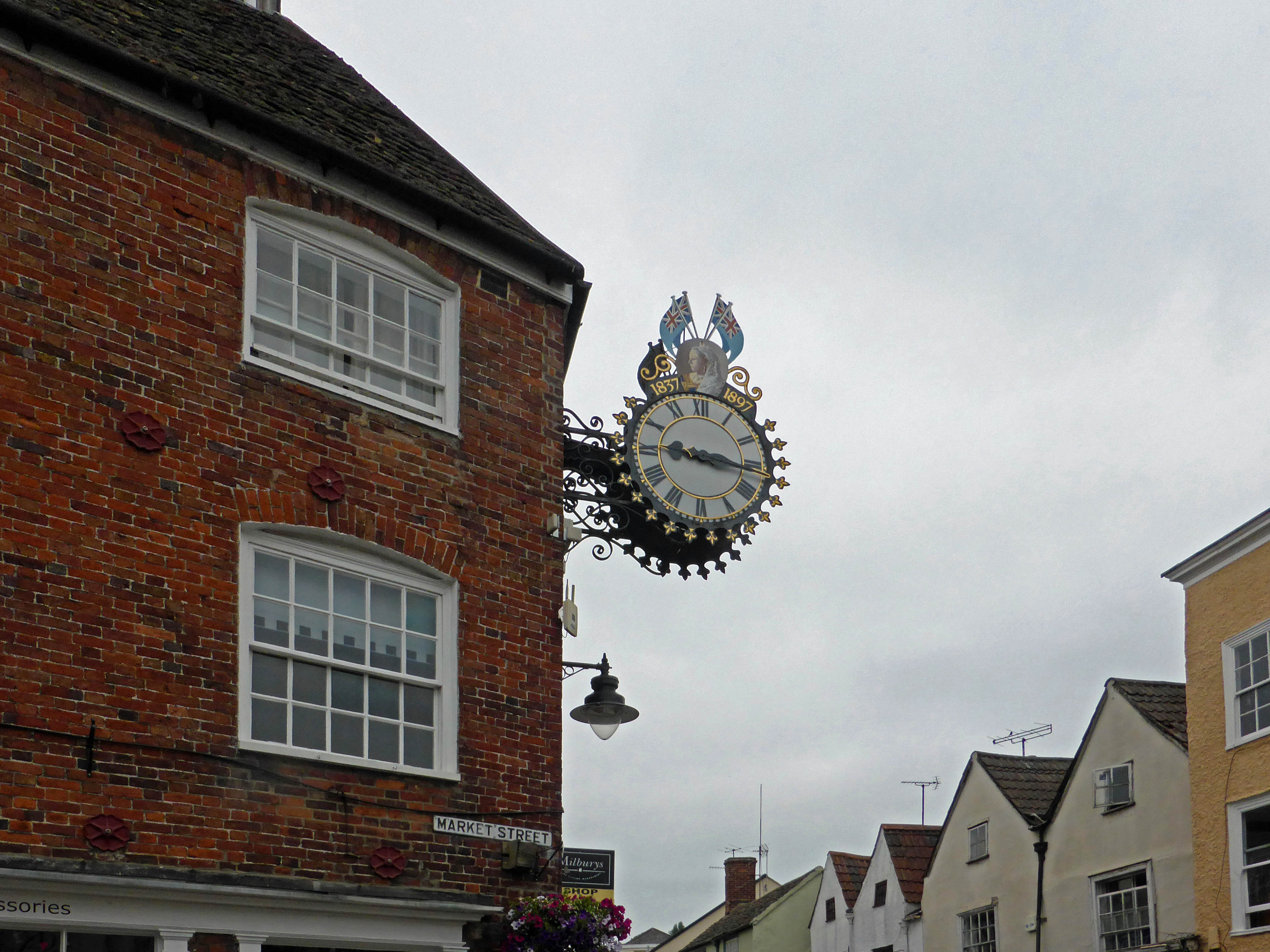
The Tolsey clock commemorates the diamond jubilee (60 years) of Queen Victoria's reign. The clock says "1837 – 1897". It lies between Market Street and High Street in Wotton-under-Edge, Gloucestershire, England.

George III of the United Kingdom died nine months before his diamond jubilee was due in 1820. The Diamond Jubilee of Queen Victoria celebrated her 60-year reign on 22 June 1897. The Diamond Jubilee of Elizabeth II was celebrated across the Commonwealth of Nations throughout 2012.

== Asian monarchies ==
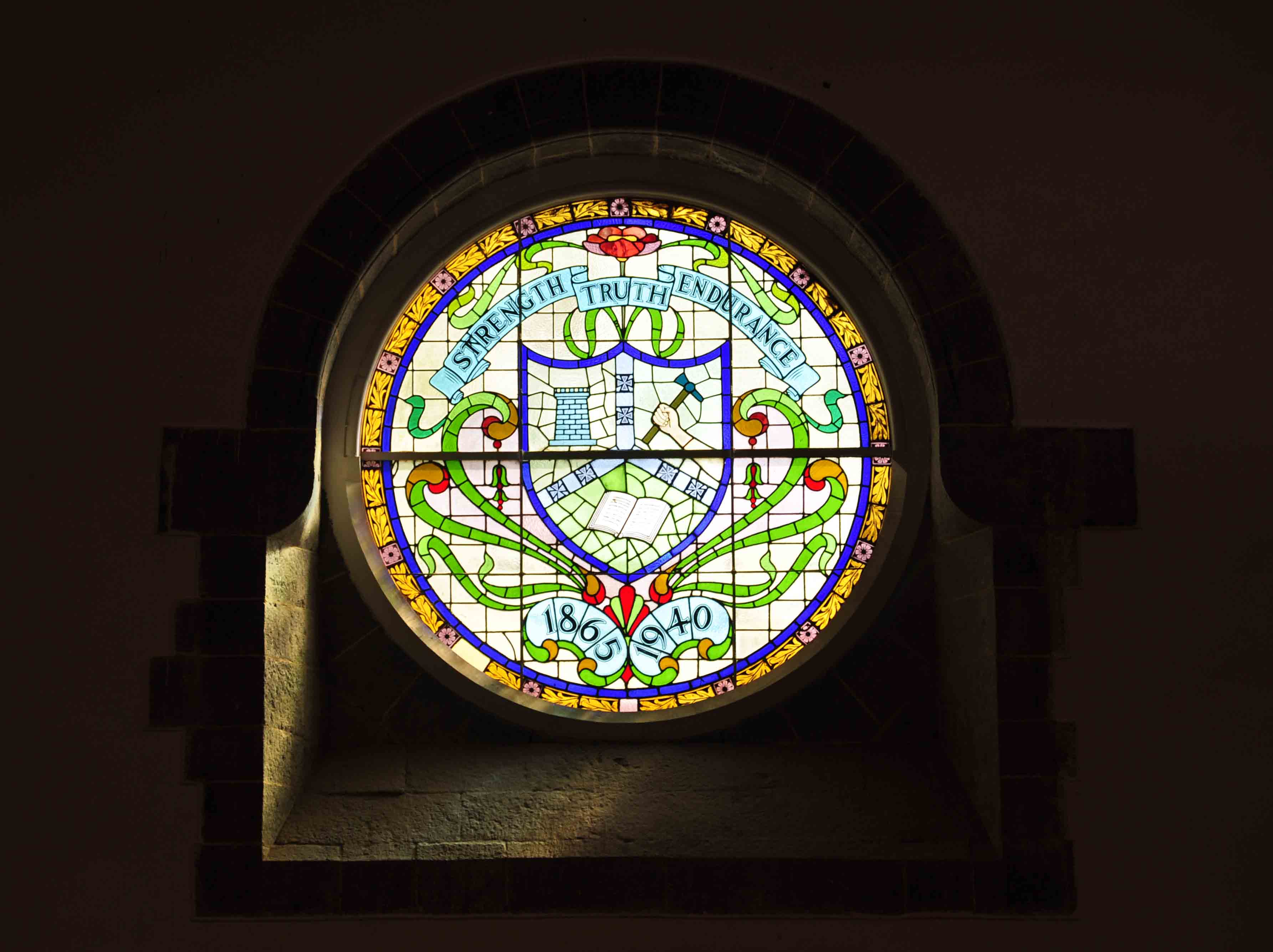
Diamond jubilee window at the College of Engineering, Pune, India

In East Asia, the diamond jubilee coincides with the traditional 60-year sexagenary cycle, which is held in special importance despite not generally being called a "diamond jubilee." Monarchs such as the Kangxi and Qianlong emperors of China and Emperor Hirohito of Japan held celebrations for their 60th year of reign, as did King Bhumibol Adulyadej of Thailand on 10 June 2006.

National governments also mark their 60th anniversary as diamond jubilees, as did the Republic of Korea in 2005 and the People's Republic of China in 2009. In South Asia, the term is also used for certain 100-day anniversaries. In the Indian and Pakistani film industries, a "diamond jubilee" film is a title that has been featured in cinemas for 100 days, and beyond.

== African monarchies ==
The longest reigning monarch in history, Sobhuza II of Swaziland, celebrated his (60 year) diamond jubilee in 1981, dating from when he gained direct rule. There does not appear to have been any (75 year) diamond jubilee celebration.

== List of diamond jubilees ==
=== Monarchs ===
| Monarch | Realm | Accession day | Commemoration | More information |
|---|---|---|---|---|
| Queen Victoria | United Kingdom of Great Britain and Ireland and the rest of the British Empire | 20 June 1837 | 22 June 1897 | Diamond Jubilee of Queen Victoria |
| Emperor Franz Joseph I | Austrian Empire, Austria-Hungary | 2 December 1848 | 12 June 1908 | |
| Prince Johann II | Liechtenstein | 12 November 1858 | 1918 | |
| Sultan Ibrahim of Johor | Johor | 7 September 1895 | 17 September 1955 | |
| King Sobhuza II | Swaziland | 10 December 1899 | 1959 | |
| Emperor Hirohito | Japan | 25 December 1926 | 29 April 1986 | |
| King Bhumibol Adulyadej | Thailand | 9 June 1946 | 10 June 2006 | 60th Anniversary Celebrations of Bhumibol Adulyadej's Accession |
| Queen Elizabeth II | United Kingdom, Australia, Canada and New Zealand | 6 February 1952 | 2–5 June 2012 | Diamond Jubilee of Elizabeth II |
| His Highness Prince Aga Khan IV | Nizari Isma'ilism | 11 July 1957 | 11 July 2017 – 11 July 2018 | |

=== Sovereign states and dependent territories ===
| Sovereign state or dependent territory | Independence day or formation day | Commemoration | More information |
|---|---|---|---|
| Japan | 11 February 660 BC | 600 BC | |
| Iran | 550 BC | 490 BC | |
| San Marino | 3 September 301 | 3 September 361 | |
| France | 10 August 843 | 10 August 903 | |
| Thailand | 1238 | 1298 | |
| Ethiopia | 1270 | 1330 | |
| Andorra | 8 September 1278 | 8 September 1338 | |
| Switzerland | 1 August 1291 | 1 August 1351 | |
| Monaco | 8 January 1297 | 8 January 1357 | |
| Spain | 20 January 1479 | 20 January 1539 | |
| Sweden | 6 June 1523 | 6 June 1583 | |
| Russia | 16 January 1547 | 16 January 1607 | |
| Bhutan | 1616 | 1676 | |
| Portugal | 1 December 1640 | 1 December 1700 | |
| Nepal | 25 September 1768 | 25 September 1828 | |
| United States | 4 July 1776 | 4 July 1836 | |
| United Kingdom | 1 January 1801 | 1 January 1861 | |
| Haiti | 1 January 1804 | 1 January 1864 | |
| Serbia | 15 February 1804 | 15 February 1864 | |
| Ecuador | 10 August 1809 | 10 August 1869 | |
| Colombia | 20 July 1810 | 20 July 1870 | |
| Mexico | 16 September 1810 | 16 September 1870 | |
| Chile | 18 September 1810 | 18 September 1870 | |
| Paraguay | 14 May 1811 | 14 May 1871 | |
| Venezuela | 5 July 1811 | 5 July 1871 | |
| Luxembourg | 9 June 1815 | 9 June 1875 | |
| Argentina | 9 July 1816 | 9 July 1876 | |
| Greece | 25 March 1821 | 25 March 1881 | |
| Peru | 28 July 1821 | 28 July 1881 | |
| Costa Rica | 15 September 1821 | 15 September 1881 | |
| El Salvador | 15 September 1821 | 15 September 1881 | |
| Guatemala | 15 September 1821 | 15 September 1881 | |
| Honduras | 15 September 1821 | 15 September 1881 | |
| Nicaragua | 15 September 1821 | 15 September 1881 | |
| Brazil | 7 September 1822 | 7 September 1882 | |
| Bolivia | 6 August 1825 | 6 August 1885 | |
| Uruguay | 25 August 1825 | 25 August 1885 | |
| Belgium | 21 July 1831 | 21 July 1891 | |
| New Zealand | 6 February 1840 | 6 February 1900 | |
| Dominican Republic | 27 February 1844 | 27 February 1904 | |
| Liberia | 26 July 1847 | 26 July 1907 | |
| Denmark | 5 June 1849 | 5 June 1909 | |
| Italy | 17 March 1861 | 17 March 1921 | |
| Liechtenstein | 15 August 1866 | 15 August 1926 | |
| Canada | 1 July 1867 | 1 July 1926 | |
| Cuba | 10 October 1868 | 10 October 1927 | |
| Montenegro | 13 July 1878 | 13 July 1938 | |
| Qatar | 18 December 1878 | 18 December 1938 | |
| Philippines | 12 June 1898 | 12 June 1958 | |
| Guam, United States | 10 December 1898 | 10 December 1958 | |
| Puerto Rico, United States | 10 December 1898 | 10 December 1958 | |
| American Samoa, United States | 2 December 1899 | 2 December 1959 | |
| Australia | 1 January 1901 | 1 January 1961 | |
| North Macedonia | 2 August 1903 | 2 August 1963 | |
| Panama | 3 November 1903 | 3 November 1963 | |
| Norway | 7 June 1905 | 7 June 1965 | |
| Bulgaria | 22 September 1908 | 22 September 1968 | |
| South Africa | 31 May 1910 | 31 May 1970 | |
| Mongolia | 29 December 1911 | 29 December 1971 | |
| Taiwan | 1 January 1912 | 1 January 1972 | |
| Albania | 28 November 1912 | 28 November 1972 | |
| Ireland | 24 April 1916 | 24 April 1976 | |
| United States Virgin Islands, the United States | 31 March 1917 | 31 March 1977 | |
| Finland | 6 December 1917 | 6 December 1977 | |
| Lithuania | 16 February 1918 | 16 February 1978 | |
| Estonia | 24 February 1918 | 24 February 1978 | |
| Georgia | 26 May 1918 | 26 May 1978 | |
| Armenia | 28 May 1918 | 28 May 1978 | |
| Azerbaijan | 28 May 1918 | 28 May 1978 | |
| Czech Republic | 28 October 1918 | 28 October 1978 | |
| Slovakia | 28 October 1918 | 28 October 1978 | |
| Poland | 11 November 1918 | 11 November 1978 | |
| Latvia | 18 November 1918 | 18 November 1978 | |
| Romania | 1 December 1918 | 1 December 1978 | |
| Ukraine | 22 January 1919 | 22 January 1979 | |
| Afghanistan | 19 August 1919 | 19 August 1979 | |
| Åland, Finland | 7 May 1920 | 7 May 1980 | |
| Vatican City | 11 February 1929 | 11 February 1989 | |
| Iraq | 3 October 1932 | 3 October 1992 | |
| Lebanon | 22 November 1943 | 22 November 2003 | |
| Iceland | 17 June 1944 | 17 June 2004 | |
| Belarus | 3 July 1944 | 3 July 2004 | |
| North Korea | 15 August 1945 | 15 August 2005 | |
| South Korea | 15 August 1945 | 15 August 2005 | |
| Indonesia | 17 August 1945 | 17 August 2005 | |
| Vietnam | 2 September 1945 | 2 September 2005 | |
| Syria | 17 April 1946 | 17 April 2006 | |
| Jordan | 25 May 1946 | 25 May 2006 | |
| Pakistan | 14 August 1947 | 14 August 2007 | |
| India | 15 August 1947 | 15 August 2007 | |
| Myanmar | 25 January 1948 | 25 January 2008 | |
| Sri Lanka | 4 February 1948 | 4 February 2008 | |
| Faroe Islands, Denmark | 23 March 1948 | 23 March 2008 | |
| Israel | 14 May 1948 | 14 May 2008 | |
| China | 1 October 1949 | 1 October 2009 | 60th anniversary of the People's Republic of China |
| Libya | 24 December 1951 | 24 December 2011 | |
| Egypt | 23 July 1952 | 23 July 2012 | |
| Laos | 22 October 1953 | 22 October 2013 | |
| Cambodia | 9 November 1953 | 9 November 2013 | |
| Morocco | 18 November 1955 | 18 November 2015 | |
| Cocos (Keeling) Islands, Australia | 23 November 1955 | 23 November 2015 | |
| Sudan | 1 January 1956 | 1 January 2016 | |
| Tunisia | 20 March 1956 | 20 March 2016 | |
| Ghana | 6 March 1957 | 6 March 2017 | |
| Malaysia | 31 August 1957 | 31 August 2017 | |
| Guinea | 2 October 1958 | 2 October 2018 | |
| Senegal | 4 April 1960 | 4 April 2020 | |
| Togo | 27 April 1960 | 27 April 2020 | |
| Somaliland | 26 June 1960 | 26 June 2020 | |
| Madagascar | 26 June 1960 | 26 June 2020 | |
| Congo, Democratic Republic of the | 30 June 1960 | 30 June 2020 | |
| Somalia | 1 July 1960 | 1 July 2020 | |
| Benin | 1 August 1960 | 1 August 2020 | |
| Niger | 3 August 1960 | 3 August 2020 | |
| Burkina Faso | 5 August 1960 | 5 August 2020 | |
| Ivory Coast | 7 August 1960 | 7 August 2020 | |
| Chad | 11 August 1960 | 11 August 2020 | |
| Central African Republic | 13 August 1960 | 13 August 2020 | |
| Congo, Republic of the | 15 August 1960 | 15 August 2020 | |
| Gabon | 17 August 1960 | 17 August 2020 | |
| Mali | 22 September 1960 | 22 September 2020 | |
| Cyprus | 1 October 1960 | 1 October 2020 | |
| Nigeria | 1 October 1960 | 1 October 2020 | |
| Mauritania | 28 November 1960 | 28 November 2020 | |
| Kuwait | 25 February 1961 | 25 February 2021 | |
| Sierra Leone | 27 April 1961 | 27 April 2021 | |
| Tanzania | 9 December 1961 | 9 December 2021 | |
| Samoa | 1 June 1962 | 1 June 2022 | |
| Burundi | 1 July 1962 | 1 July 2022 | |
| Rwanda | 1 July 1962 | 1 July 2022 | |
| Algeria | 5 July 1962 | 5 July 2022 | |
| Jamaica | 6 August 1962 | 6 August 2022 | |
| Trinidad and Tobago | 31 August 1962 | 31 August 2022 | |
| Uganda | 9 October 1962 | 9 October 2022 | |
| Kenya | 12 December 1963 | 12 December 2023 | |
| Malawi | 6 July 1964 | 6 July 2024 | |
| Malta | 21 September 1964 | 21 September 2024 | |
| Zambia | 24 October 1964 | 24 October 2024 | |
| Gambia | 18 February 1965 | 18 February 2025 | |
| Maldives | 26 July 1965 | 26 July 2025 | |
| Singapore | 9 August 1965 | 9 August 2025 | |
| Guyana | 26 May 1966 | 26 May 2026 | |
| Botswana | 30 September 1966 | 30 September 2026 | |
| Lesotho | 4 October 1966 | 4 October 2026 | |
| Barbados | 30 November 1966 | 30 November 2026 | |

=== Organizations ===
| Organization | Inauguration | Commemoration | More information |
|---|---|---|---|
| International Olympic Committee | 23 June 1894 | 23 June 1954 | |
| BBC | 18 October 1922 | 18 October 1982 | |
| Warner Bros. Pictures | 4 April 1923 | 4 April 1983 | |
| The Walt Disney Company | 16 October 1923 | 16 October 1983 | |
| Metro-Goldwyn-Mayer | 17 April 1924 | 17 April 1984 | |
| United Nations | 24 October 1945 | 24 October 2005 | |
| Disneyland Resort | 17 July 1955 | 17 July 2015 | |
| Universal Studios Hollywood | 15 July 1964 | 17 July 2024 | |

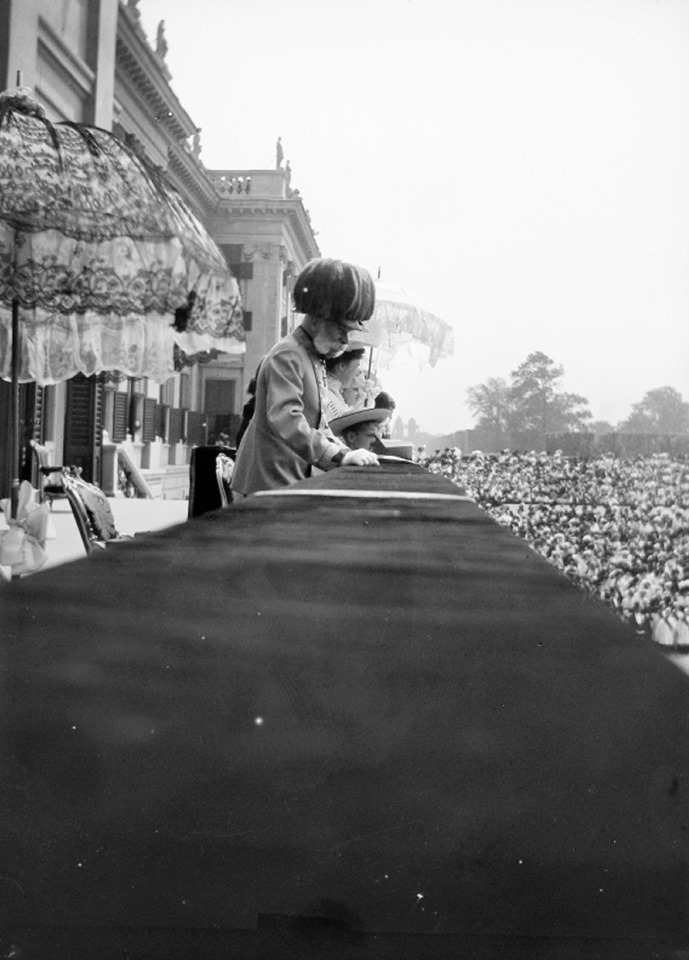
Emperor Franz Joseph on the balcony of Schönbrunn Palace on the occasion of his 60th jubilee

== See also ==
- Hierarchy of precious substances
- List of longest-reigning monarchs
- List of current reigning monarchs by length of reign
- Wedding anniversary
