= Strass =

Strass, Stras, or Straß may refer to:

== Places in Austria ==
- Strass im Zillertal, a municipality in Tyrol
- Straß in Steiermark, a municipality in Styria
- Straß im Straßertale, a municipality in Lower Austria
- Straß im Attergau, a municipality in Upper Austria

== Other uses ==
- Rhinestone or strass
- Syndicat du travail sexuel (STRASS), a sex worker organisation in France.

== People with the surname ==
- Barbara Strass (born 1974), Austrian former international team handball player
- Beata Sabina Straas or Strass (before 1737–1773)
- David Stras, a professor of law at the University of Minnesota Law School
- Georg Friedrich Strass (1701–1773), Alsatian jeweler who invented the rhinestone
