= Jaidhof =

- Municipality
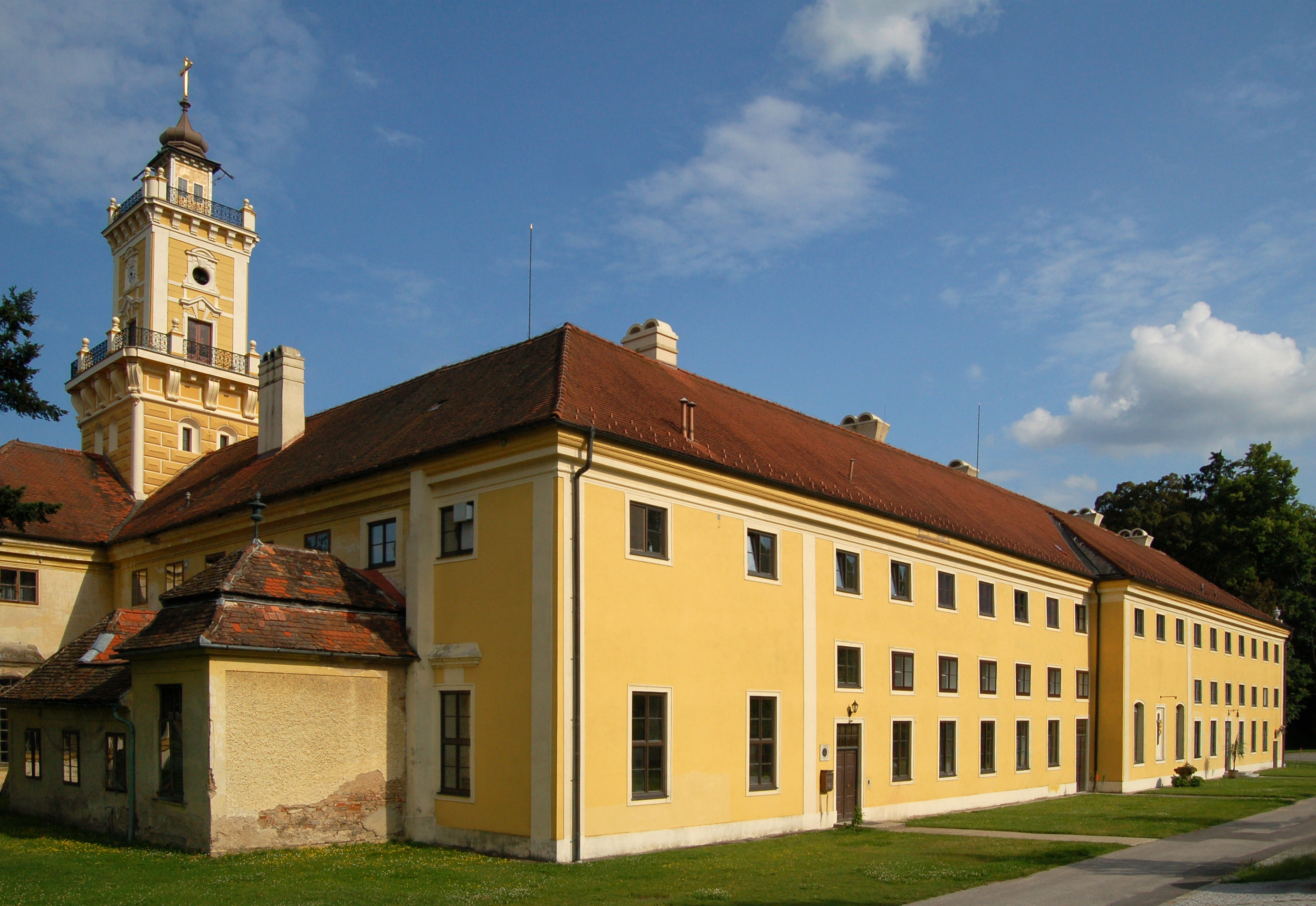
- Jaidhof Castle

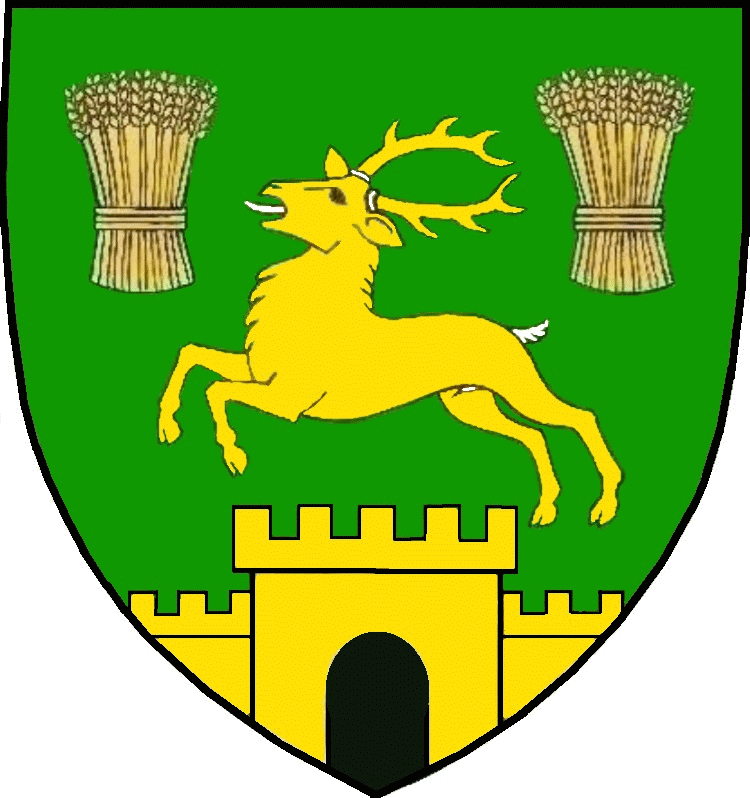
- Coat of arms

- Location within Austria
- Coordinates: 48°32′N 15°29′E
- Country: Austria
- State: Lower Austria
- District: Krems-Land

Government
  - Mayor: Franz Aschauer

Area
  - Total: 44.91 km^{2} (17.34 sq mi)
- Elevation: 592 m (1,942 ft)

Population (2018-01-01)
  - Total: 1,225
  - Density: 27.28/km^{2} (70.65/sq mi)
- Time zone: UTC+1 (CET)
  - Summer (DST): UTC+2 (CEST)
- Postal code: 3542
- Area code: 02716
- Website: www.jaidhof.at

Jaidhof is a town in the district of Krems-Land in the Austrian state of Lower Austria.

== Population ==
Historical population
Year	Pop.	±%
1971	1,309	—
1981	1,153	−11.9%
1991	1,065	−7.6%
2001	1,119	+5.1%
2011	1,161	+3.8%
2021	1,222	+5.3%
