= Droß =

- Municipality
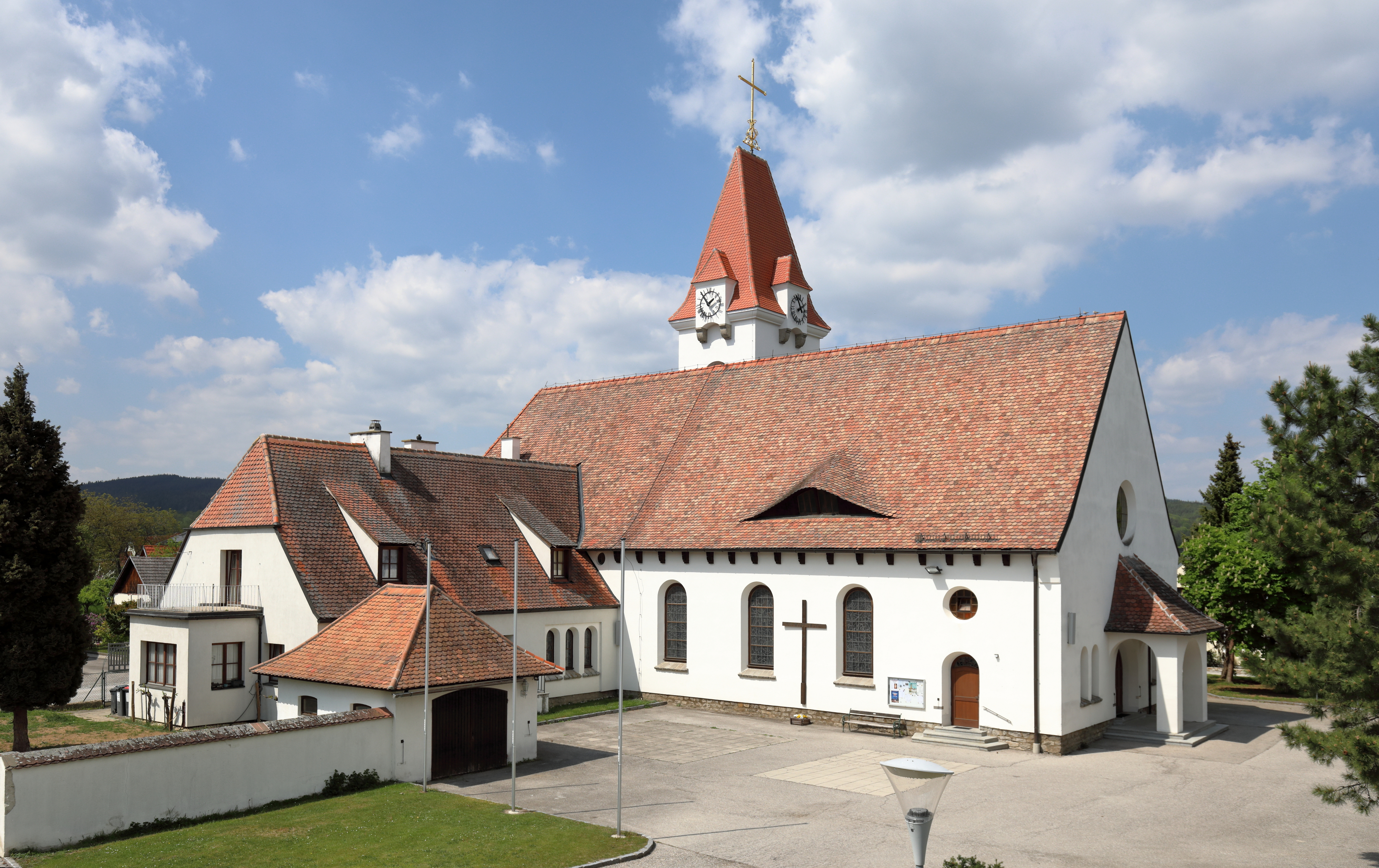
- Parish church and rectory

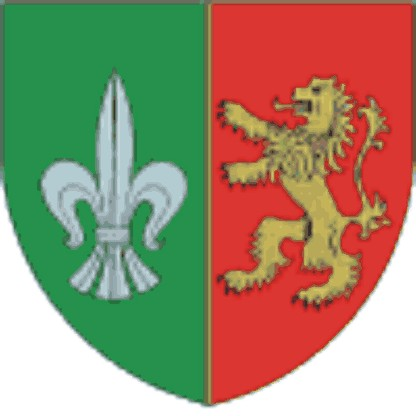
- Coat of arms

- Location within Austria
- Coordinates: 48°27′N 15°34′E
- Country: Austria
- State: Lower Austria
- District: Krems-Land

Government
  - Mayor: Andreas Neuwirth (ÖVP)

Area
  - Total: 10.3 km^{2} (4.0 sq mi)
- Elevation: 394 m (1,293 ft)

Population (2018-01-01)
  - Total: 983
  - Density: 95.4/km^{2} (247/sq mi)
- Time zone: UTC+1 (CET)
  - Summer (DST): UTC+2 (CEST)
- Postal code: 3552
- Area code: 02719

Droß is a municipality in the district of Krems-Land, Lower Austria, Austria.

== Population ==
Historical population
Year	Pop.	±%
1951	515	—
1961	485	−5.8%
1971	535	+10.3%
1981	591	+10.5%
1991	648	+9.6%
2001	778	+20.1%
2011	915	+17.6%
2011	1,039	+13.6%

== Twin towns ==
Droß is twinned with:

- Fátima, Portugal

== Personalities ==
- Franz Krenn, composer, was born here.
