= Krems District =

Coordinates: 48.450°N 15.567°E

Krems District Bezirk Krems
- District
- Country: Austria
- State: Lower Austria
- Number of municipalities: 29
- Administrative seat: Krems

Government
  - District Governor: Günter Stöger (since 2021)

Area
  - Total: 923.95 km^{2} (356.74 sq mi)

Population (2024)
  - Total: 56,876
  - Density: 61.557/km^{2} (159.43/sq mi)
- Time zone: UTC+01:00 (CET)
  - Summer (DST): UTC+02:00 (CEST)
- Telephone prefix: 2732
- Vehicle registration: KR
- NUTS code: AT124
- District code: 313

Bezirk Krems is a district of the state of Lower Austria in Austria. It comprises the areas to the south, west and north of the city of Krems an der Donau, which itself is a statutory city.

== Municipalities ==
Suburbs, hamlets and other subdivisions of a municipality are indicated in small characters.

- Aggsbach
  - Aggsbach Markt, Groisbach Köfering, Willendorf in der Wachau
- Albrechtsberg an der Großen Krems
  - Albrechtsberg an der Großen Krems, Arzwiesen, Attenreith, Els, Eppenberg, Gillaus, Harrau, Klein-Heinrichschlag, Marbach an der Kleinen Krems, Purkersdorf
- Bergern im Dunkelsteinerwald
  - Geyersberg, Maria Langegg, Nesselstauden, Oberbergern, Paltmühl, Plaimberg, Scheiblwies, Schenkenbrunn, Unterbergern, Wolfenreith
- Droß
  - Droß, Droßeramt
- Dürnstein
  - Dürnstein, Dürnsteiner Waldhütten, Oberloiben, Rothenhof, Unterloiben
- Furth bei Göttweig
  - Aigen, Furth bei Göttweig, Klein-Wien, Oberfucha, Palt, Steinaweg, Stift Göttweig
- Gedersdorf
  - Altweidling, Brunn im Felde, Donaudorf, Gedersdorf, Schlickendorf, Stratzdorf, Theiß
- Gföhl
  - Felling, Garmanns, Gföhl, Gföhleramt, Großmotten, Grottendorf, Hohenstein, Lengenfelderamt, Litschgraben, Mittelbergeramt, Moritzreith, Neubau, Ober-Meisling, Rastbach, Riesling, Reittern, Seeb, Unter-Meisling, Wurfenthalgraben
- Grafenegg
  - Diendorf am Kamp, Engabrunn, Etsdorf am Kamp, Grafenegg, Grunddorf, Haitzendorf, Kamp, Sittendorf, Walkersdorf am Kamp
- Hadersdorf-Kammern
  - Hadersdorf am Kamp, Kammern
- Jaidhof
  - Eisenbergeramt, Eisengraben, Eisengraberamt, Jaidhof, Schiltingeramt, Schiltingeramt
- Krumau am Kamp
  - Eisenberg, Idolsberg, Krumau am Kamp, Krumauer Waldhütten, Preinreichs, Thurnberg, Tiefenbach, Unterdobrawaldhütten
- Langenlois
  - Gobelsburg, Langenlois, Mittelberg, Reith, Schiltern, Zeiselberg, Zöbing
- Lengenfeld
- Lichtenau im Waldviertel
  - Allentsgschwendt, Brunn am Wald, Ebergersch, Engelschalks, Erdweis, Gloden, Großreinprechts, Jeitendorf, Kornberg, Ladings, Lichtenau, Loiwein, Obergrünbach, Pallweis, Scheutz, Taubitz, Wietzen, Wurschenaigen
- Maria Laach am Jauerling
  - Benking, Felbring, Friedersdorf, Gießhübl, Haslarn, Hinterkogel, Hof, Kuffarn, Litzendorf, Loitzendorf, Maria Laach am Jauerling, Mitterndorf, Nonnersdorf, Oberndorf, Schlaubing, Thalham, Weinberg, Wiesmannsreith, Zeißing, Zintring
- Mautern an der Donau
  - Baumgarten, Hundsheim, Mautern an der Donau, Mauternbach
- Mühldorf
  - Amstall, Elsarn am Jauerling, Mühldorf, Niederranna, Oberranna, Ötz, Ötzbach, Povat, Trandorf
- Paudorf
  - Eggendorf, Höbenbach, Hörfarth, Krustetten, Meidling, Paudorf, Tiefenfucha
- Rastenfeld
  - Marbach im Felde, Mottingeramt, Niedergrünbach, Ottenstein, Peygarten-Ottenstein, Rastenberg, Rastenfeld, Sperkental, Zierings
- Rohrendorf bei Krems
  - Neustift an der Donau, Neuweidling, Oberrohrendorf, Unterrohrendorf
- Rossatz-Arnsdorf
  - Bacharnsdorf, Hofarnsdorf, Mitterarnsdorf, Oberarnsdorf, Rossatz, Rossatzbach, Rührsdorf, St. Johann im Mauerthale, St. Lorenz
- Sankt Leonhard am Hornerwald
  - Obertautendorferamt, St. Leonhard am Hornerwald, Untertautendorferamt, Wilhalm, Wolfshoferamt
- Schönberg am Kamp
  - Altenhof, Buchberger Waldhütten, Fernitz, Freischling, Kriegenreith, Mollands, Oberplank, Plank am Kamp, Raan, Schönberg, Schönberg-Neustift, See, Stiefern, Thürneustift
- Senftenberg
  - Imbach, Meislingeramt, Priel, Reichaueramt, Senftenberg, Senftenbergeramt
- Spitz
  - Gut am Steg, Schwallenbach, Spitz, Vießling
- Straß im Straßertale
  - Diendorf am Walde, Elsarn im Straßertal, Obernholz, Straß im Straßertale, Wiedendorf
- Stratzing
- Weinzierl am Walde
  - Großheinrichschlag, Habruck, Himberg, Lobendorf, Maigen, Neusiedl, Nöhagen, Ostra, Reichau, Stixendorf, Weinzierl am Walde, Wolfenreith
- Weißenkirchen in der Wachau
  - Joching, St. Michael, Weißenkirchen in der Wachau, Wösendorf in der Wachau
