= Schönberg am Kamp =

- Municipality
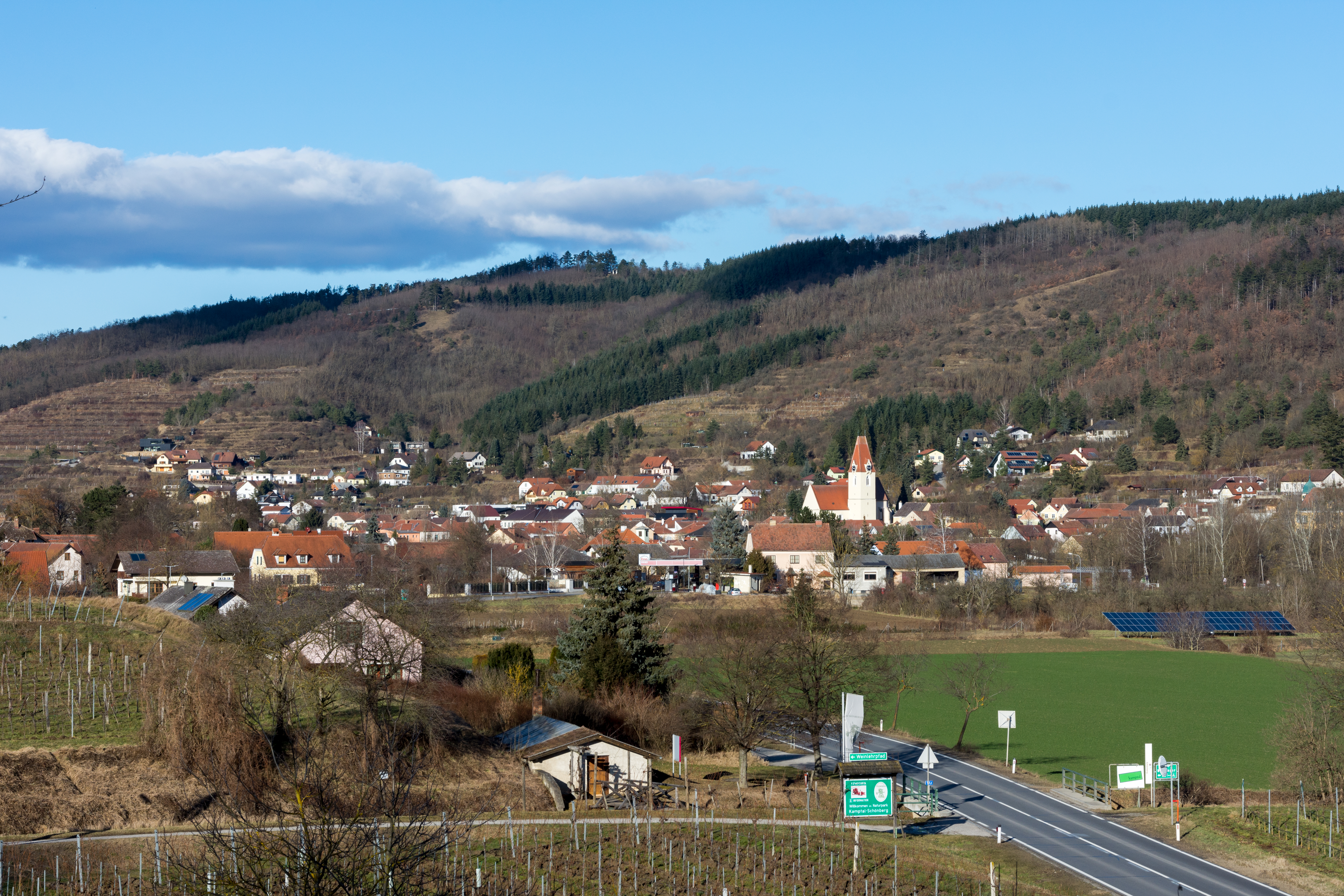
- View from south

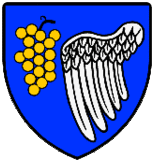
- Coat of arms

- Location within Austria
- Coordinates: 48°31′N 15°42′E
- Country: Austria
- State: Lower Austria
- District: Krems-Land

Government
  - Mayor: Michael Strommer, ÖVP

Area
  - Total: 53.28 km^{2} (20.57 sq mi)
- Elevation: 226 m (741 ft)

Population (2018-01-01)
  - Total: 1,903
  - Density: 35.72/km^{2} (92.51/sq mi)
- Time zone: UTC+1 (CET)
  - Summer (DST): UTC+2 (CEST)
- Postal code: 3564
- Area code: 02733
- Website: www.schoenberg.gv.at

Schönberg am Kamp is a town in the district of Krems-Land in the Austrian state of Lower Austria.

== Population ==
Historical population
Year	Pop.	±%
1923	2,596	—
1951	2,408	−7.2%
1961	2,130	−11.5%
1971	2,034	−4.5%
1981	1,914	−5.9%
1991	1,881	−1.7%
2001	1,901	+1.1%
2011	1,896	−0.3%
2025	1,836	−3.2%
