= Franz Krenn =

Austrian composer (1816–1897)

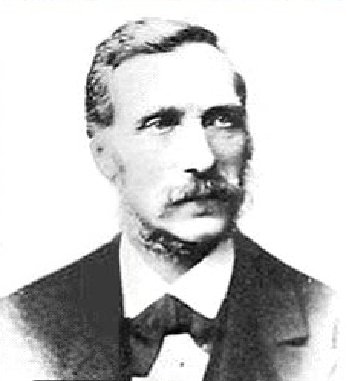
Franz Krenn

Franz Krenn (26 February 1816 – 18 June 1897) was an Austrian composer and composition teacher born in Droß. He studied under Ignaz von Seyfried in Vienna, and served as organist in a number of Viennese churches, becoming Kapellmeister of St. Michael's Church in Vienna in 1862. From 1869 until 1893 Krenn taught harmony, counterpoint and composition at the Vienna Conservatory. During this time, he appears to have acquired the nickname 'Old Krenn', and is today often described as having been a rather pedantic teacher.

Among his well-known pupils are Leoš Janáček, Mathilde Kralik, Gustav Mahler, who studied with him between 1875 and 1878, Richard Robert, Hans Rott, and Alexander von Zemlinsky. See: List of music pupils by teacher#Franz Krenn. His compositions include masses, cantatas, oratorios, requiems, choral and solo songs, works for organ and piano, and symphonies. He died in Sankt Andrä-Wördern.
