= Mathilde Kralik =

Austrian pianist and composer

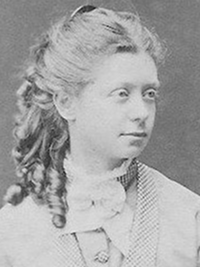
- Mathilde Kralik von Meyrswalden

Background information
- Born: December 3, 1857; Linz, Austrian Empire
- Died: 8 March 1944 (aged 86) Vienna, Alpine and Danube Reichsgaue, Greater German Reich
- Genre: Classical
- Occupation: Composer

Mathilde Aloisia Kralik von Meyrswalden (3 December 1857, in Linz – 8 March 1944) was an Austrian composer.

== Biography ==
Mathilde Kralik was the daughter of Bohemian glass industrialist Wilhelm Kralik von Meyrswalden (1807–1877) from Eleonorenhain. After the death of his first wife Anna Maria Pinhak (1814–1850), he married Louise Lobmeyr (1832–1905) on 28 May 1851. Mathilde was the fourth of five children from his second marriage to Louise née Lobmeyr. Her brother was Richard Kralik von Meyrswalden, the poet philosopher, historian and arts administrator.

Kralik was born in Linz, and her first compositions were lyrical poems and hymns based on her brother's works. The family regularly had music in the house, as her father William played the violin and her mother Louise played piano. In this way the musically gifted children not only learned the milieu of classical chamber music, but also string orchestra furnished music of the time by Haydn, Mozart and Beethoven. Early on the parents recognized the musical gifts of their daughter, and the financial circumstances of her father allowed Mathilde the best music teachers of her time.

Kralik took piano lessons from her mother, and later was a pupil of Anton Bruckner, Franz Krenn and Julius Epstein. She passed the 1876 entrance examination for the Conservatory of the Society of Friends of Music, and studied at the Conservatory from 1876 to 1878. She won the second prize for a Scherzo for piano quintet and received first prize for her thesis, Intermezzo from a suite. Kralik graduated from the conservatory with a diploma in composition and the Silver Society Medal.

In October 1905, her mother died at age 74, causing her work to stagnate for half a year. From 1912 onward she lived in their home alone until she took an apartment with Alice Scarlat (1882–1959) in Vienna. She died 8 March 1944 in Vienna.

== Autobiographical note of 19 October 1904 ==
"I was born on 3 December 1857 in Linz on the Danube. My father Wilhelm Kralik von Meyrswalden (d. 1877) was a glass manufacturer (head of the Meyr's Neffe factory in Bohemia), my mother Louise was born Lobmeyr (sister of Ludwig Lobmeyr, a member of the House of Lords and glass industrialist in Vienna). I owe my musical sense and love of music to my father and mother. My father was a passionate violinist, albeit self-taught, and an avid quartet player in the Bohemian Forest. My mother played the piano well as a dilettante and was already inclined towards classical music as a girl. I first heard Beethoven's violin sonatas from my parents, Haydn's and Mozart's sounds were first imparted to me through the quartets at home. Later, my two older brothers and finally I took over domestic music-making from them, which consisted of duets, trios and quartets of our classics.

I enjoyed my first piano lessons with my mother, then with Eduard Hauptmann in Linz. My first attempts at composition were encouraged by my brother Richard, who took a lively interest in it. After we moved to Vienna in 1870, I received lessons in piano and harmony from Carl Hertlein (flutist at the Court Opera). In 1875 I became a private pupil of Professor Julius Epstein for piano. He took a serious interest in my compositions and advised me to continue my training with Anton Bruckner for counterpoint. I enjoyed his private lessons for a year until I entered the composition school of the Vienna Conservatory in October 1876. I was accepted into the second year of Professor Franz Krenn. After graduating from the following third year, I received the first prize. In the following years we cultivated a cappella singing in our house, through which I became more familiar with the works of the Dutch, Italian and German masters of the fifteenth and sixteenth centuries. I consider Bach as my main teacher, for the modern forms I am primarily interested in Liszt. My compositions are partly printed, the greater part still manuscript."

== Reception ==
Kralik's works became popular in the concert scene of Austria. On 19 April 1894 and on 19 April 1895, her compositions were performed at the Brahms-Saal of the Musikverein. In the 1898/99 season, the Quartet Duesberg presented her 1880 composed Piano Trio in F Major (1880). Josef Venantius von Wöss hosted a concert in the Great Hall of the Musikverein on 12 January 1900 where her work The Baptism of Christ after a poem by Pope Leo XIII was presented. Her Christmas Cantata for solo, choir and orchestra was also staged. On 20 March 1908 in the Brahms-Saal, a concert included four songs and arias from her fairy-tale opera Blume and Weissblume.

The opera Blume und Weissblume was presented in Hagen in 1910, and in Bielsko in 1912, and was popular not only because of these two performances, but also because of sensationalist coverage in the press. The former Capuchin friar Nicasius Schusser had written an opera Quo Vadis, in which he copied 52 pages from Kralik's opera note for note. Mathilde responded in the press, but gave up legal action against Schusser.

After World War I the popularity of Kralik's work declined. However, there has been a recent reawakening of interest in her work. On 30 June 2007, a concert took place in the "Alte Kirche" in Krefeld under the musical direction of the pianist Timur Sergeyenia, partly dedicated to the music of Mathilde Kralik. In 2019, works by Mathilde Kralik were heard in a concert at the University of Music and Performing Arts Vienna, which took place as part of Europride and was dedicated to the music of Ethel Smyth and her "queer contemporaries". Kralik's symphony in F minor (1903/revised 1942) and violin concerto (1937) were performed at the Brucknerhaus in Linz on 18 September 2021, by Francesca Dego with the Female Symphonic Orchestra of Austria, conducted by Silvia Spinnato.

== Honours ==
Kralik was an Honorary President of the Women's Choir Association Vienna, and a member of the Vienna Bach community, the Austrian Composers, the Association of Writers and Artists Club of Vienna and the Viennese Musicians.

== Selected works ==
=== Opera ===
- Blume und Weissblume, fairy play in three acts. The text of her brother Richard, after the popular book and Flos Blankenflos. Performances on 13 October 1910 in the Municipal Theater Hagen / Westphalia, and on 29 October 1912 in Bielsko-Biala, Silesia.
- Unter der Linde, lyric opera in one act with text by her brother Richard. The opera remained unperformed.
- Der heilige Gral (The Holy Grail), music for dramatic poetry of her brother Richard in three acts. Premiere 1912

=== Melodrama (spoken voice and piano) ===
- Luke, the physician, with text by her brother Richard, 1895
- Prinzesslein in Vierblattklee, text by E. Reimer-Ironside, June 1912
- Joan of Arc's death march, text by Alice Baroness von Gaudy, 1920

=== Oratorios ===
- Pfingsfeier, a liturgical oratorio. Text PW Schmidt 1925/26
- St. Leopold, with text by her brother Richard. Premiere in *Klosterneuburg, Stiftskeller Hall on 10 December 1933

=== Cantatas ===
- Volkers watch (the watch on the Danube), Festgesang, soloists and choir with text by her brother Richard 1907/1908

=== Sacred music ===
- Mass in B♭ major (Introit, Gradual, Offertory, Communion), 1903
- Ave Maria, 4 female voices, 1936
- You blissful sunny world, (SATB & cong., chorus, Piano) Text: FW Weber

=== Orchestral works ===
- Fest-Ouvertüre on the Austrian National Anthem for Choir and Orchestra in G major, January 1897
- Fest-Ouvertüre Charlemagne in Vienna, June 1906
- Hymnische Symphony in F minor, 1903 (revised 1942)
  1. Rapsodisch
  2. Adagio
  3. Scherzo (sehr rasch) – Trio (ruhiger)
  4. Rasches Tempo – Feurig – Schwungvoll – Hymne (with soprano solo)
- Concerto for violin, string orchestra & timpani in D minor (1st movement in 1937, second movement in Dec. 1936)

=== Chamber music ===
- Sonata in D minor (violin and piano), 1878
- Trio in F major (piano, violin and cello), 1880
- Nonet in C minor (piano, clarinet, 2 horns, bassoon and string quartet), 1901
- Fantasy (piano, cello), January 1929
- Sonnet (clarinet, bassoon, horn) 1912
- German Dances from the eastern provinces (two clarinets, cello, viola) 1943

=== Vocal works with instrumental accompaniment ===
- Autumn feeling, JW von Goethe text, 1892
- Fantasia in E minor (voice, piano, violin), Kurt Erich Rotter text of dying dreams, 1928

=== Vocal works with piano accompaniment ===
- Litany of Loreto, words by brother Richard, 1898
- The rosary, words by brother, Richard, 1898
- The love bridge, ballad, words by brother, Richard, 1896
- Empress Zita song, text by Heinrich Ritter Turzansky, 1918
- Vivat Austria, text Josef von Eichendorff, 1908
- Dragoon song, text Theodor Lehnstorff, 1914

=== Vocal music a cappella ===
- The spirit of love, text by Nathalie Duchess of Oldenburg, 1903
- Spring is coming, music and text Mathilde
- Ms Nightingale, 1931

=== Solo piano ===
- Round in January 1882
- Piano Sonata in F minor (1st movement, quasi Rhapsody) 1895
- Prelude, Passacaglia and Fugato
- Polonaise
- Schubert homage march, 1928

=== Solo organ ===
- Interlude
- Festival March, 1907
- Offertory in E♭ major, 1907
