= Hadersdorf-Kammern =

- Municipality
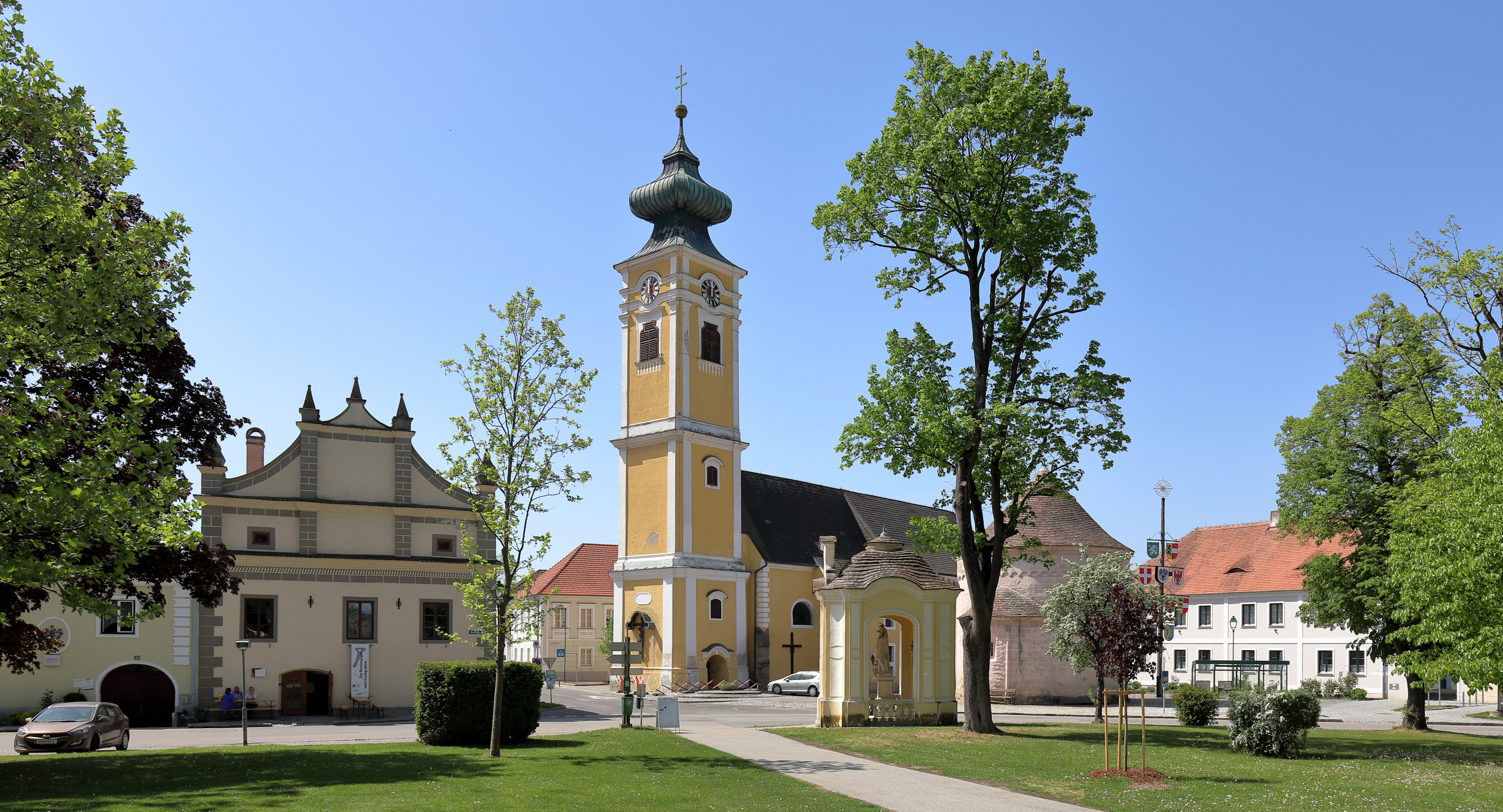

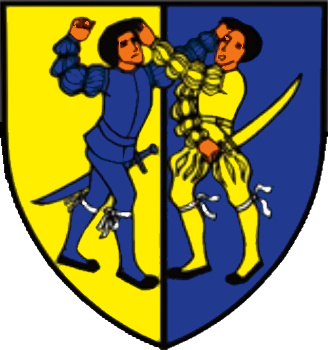
- Coat of arms

- Location within Austria
- Coordinates: 48°27′N 15°43′E
- Country: Austria
- State: Lower Austria
- District: Krems-Land

Government
  - Mayor: Liselotte Golda

Area
  - Total: 4.79 km^{2} (1.85 sq mi)
- Elevation: 202 m (663 ft)

Population (2018-01-01)
  - Total: 2,009
  - Density: 419/km^{2} (1,090/sq mi)
- Time zone: UTC+1 (CET)
  - Summer (DST): UTC+2 (CEST)
- Postal code: 3493
- Area code: 02735
- Website: www.hadersdorf-kammern.at

Hadersdorf-Kammern is a town in the district of Krems-Land in the Austrian state of Lower Austria.

The coat of arms reflects the city's name as a pun (canting arm): Hader = quarrel, Dorf = village.

== Population ==
Historical population
Year	Pop.	±%
1971	1,395	—
1981	1,608	+15.3%
1991	1,861	+15.7%
2001	1,976	+6.2%
