= Albrechtsberg an der Großen Krems =

- Municipality
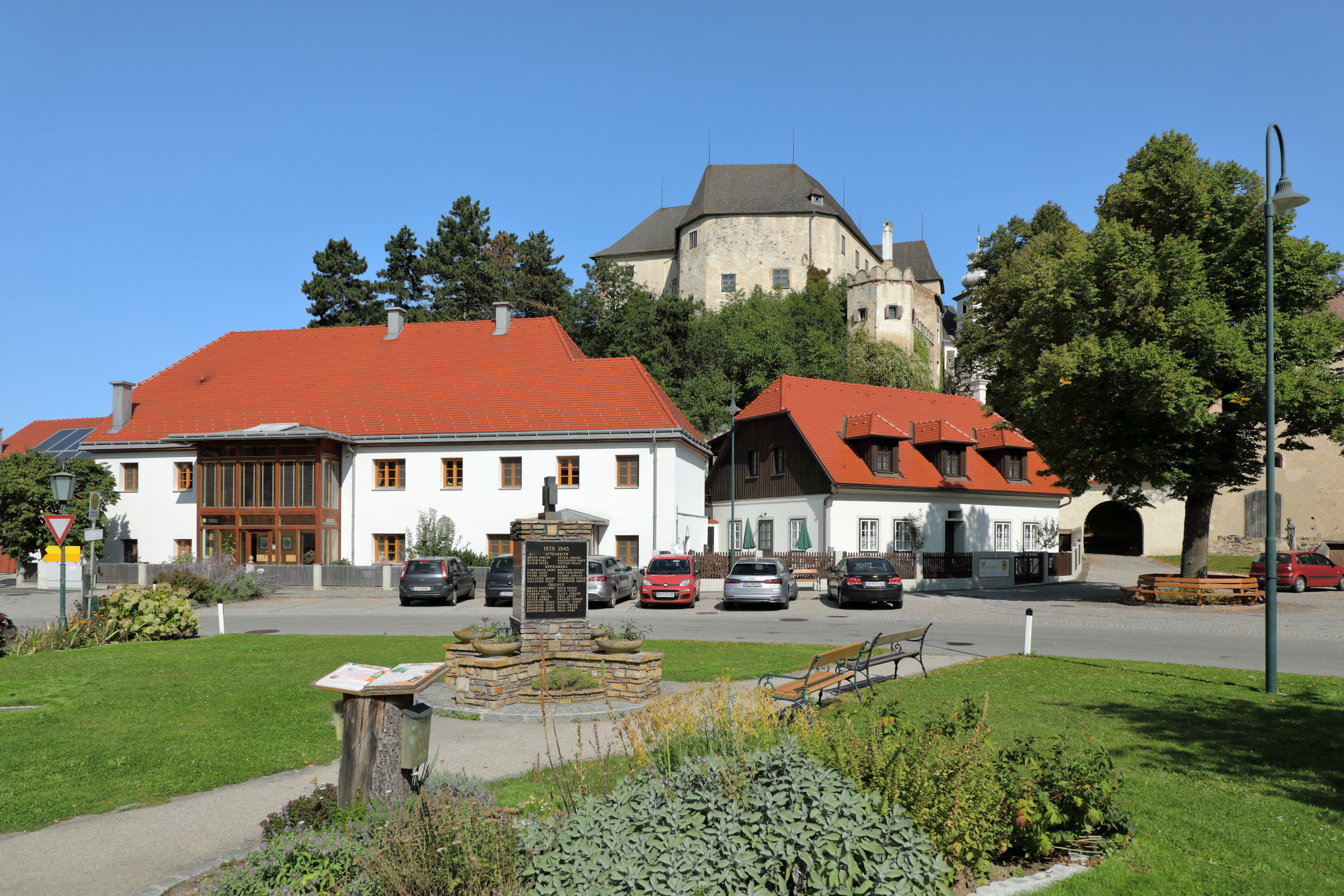
- Center of Albrechtsberg an der Großen Krems

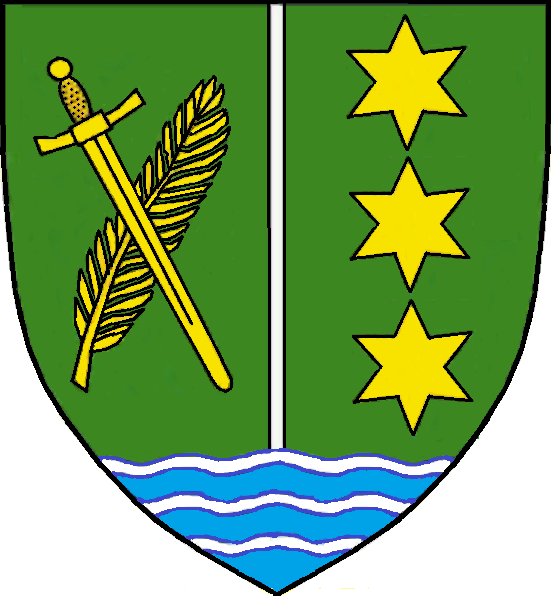
- Coat of arms

- Location within Austria
- Coordinates: 48°27′N 15°22′E
- Country: Austria
- State: Lower Austria
- District: Krems-Land

Government
  - Mayor: Franz Rosenkranz (ÖVP)

Area
  - Total: 28.74 km^{2} (11.10 sq mi)
- Elevation: 686 m (2,251 ft)

Population (2018-01-01)
  - Total: 1,036
  - Density: 36.05/km^{2} (93.36/sq mi)
- Time zone: UTC+1 (CET)
  - Summer (DST): UTC+2 (CEST)
- Postal code: 3613
- Area code: 02876

Albrechtsberg an der Großen Krems is a town in the district of Krems-Land in the Austrian state of Lower Austria.

== Population ==
Historical population
| Year | Pop. | ±% |
|---|---|---|
| 1971 | 1,305 | — |
| 1981 | 1,235 | −5.4% |
| 1991 | 1,103 | −10.7% |
| 2001 | 1,100 | −0.3% |
| 2011 | 1,054 | −4.2% |
| 2021 | 1,005 | −4.6% |

== Twin towns ==
Albrechtsberg an der Großen Krems is twinned with:

- Římov, Czech Republic
