= Mühldorf, Lower Austria =

Mühldorf
- Municipality
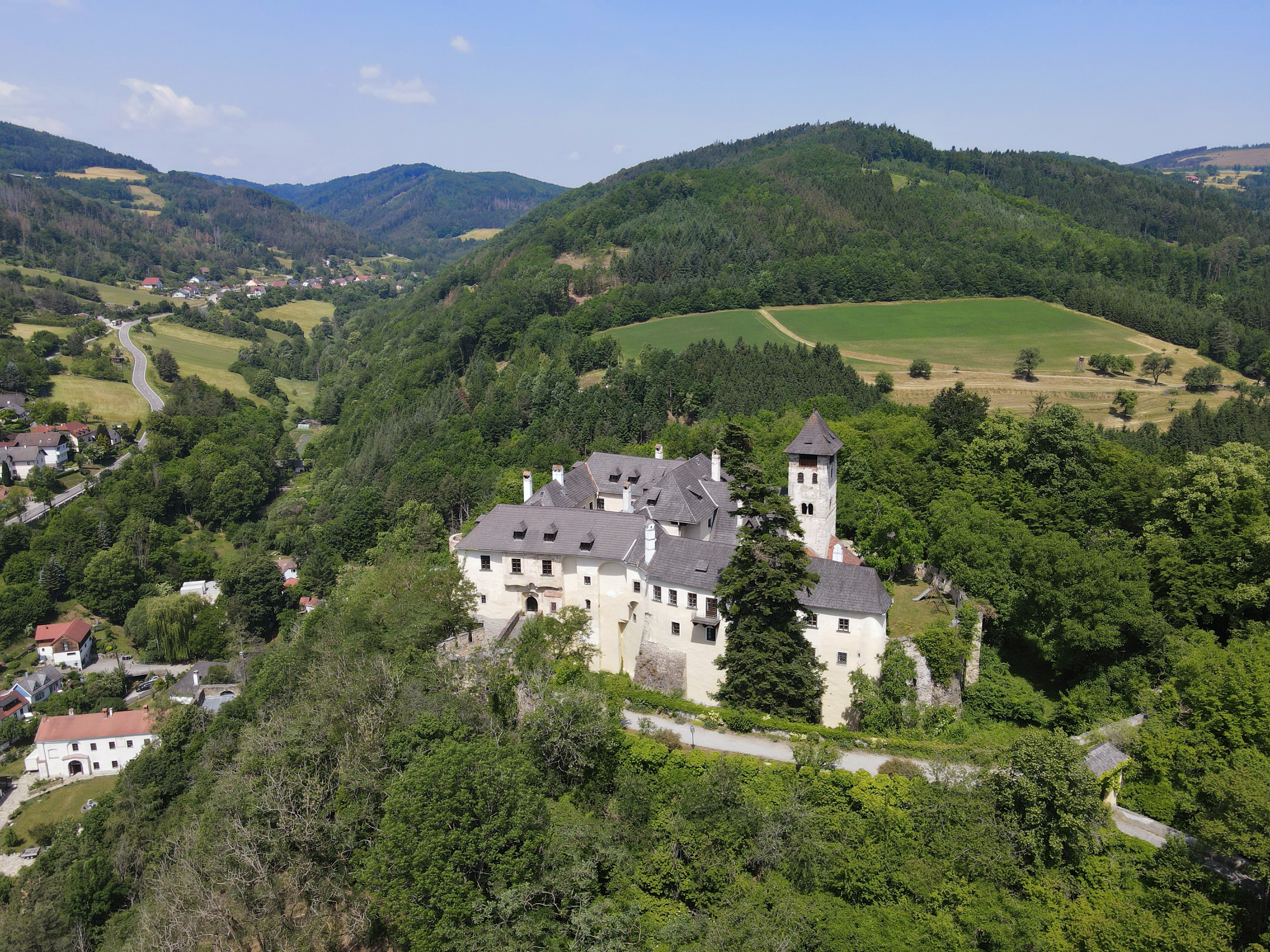
- Aerial view of Oberranna Castle in Mühldorf

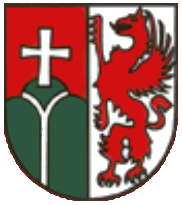
- Coat of arms

- Location within Austria
- Coordinates: 48°22′N 15°21′E
- Country: Austria
- State: Lower Austria
- District: Krems-Land

Government
  - Mayor: Roland Berger

Area
  - Total: 28.45 km^{2} (10.98 sq mi)
- Elevation: 360 m (1,180 ft)

Population (2018-01-01)
  - Total: 1,331
  - Density: 46.78/km^{2} (121.2/sq mi)
- Time zone: UTC+1 (CET)
  - Summer (DST): UTC+2 (CEST)
- Postal code: 3622
- Area code: 02713
- Vehicle registration: KR
- Website: www.muehldorf-wachau.at

Mühldorf is a town in the district of Krems-Land in the Austrian state of Lower Austria.

== Population ==
Historical population
Year	Pop.	±%
1971	1,540	—
1981	1,453	−5.6%
1991	1,474	+1.4%
2001	1,443	−2.1%
2011	1,389	−3.7%
