= Krumlov =

Krumlov may refer to:

- Český Krumlov, a town in South Bohemia, Czech Republic
- Duchy of Krumlov, a titular duchy of the Bohemia
- Moravský Krumlov, a town in South Moravia, Czech Republic
