= Paudorf =

- Municipality
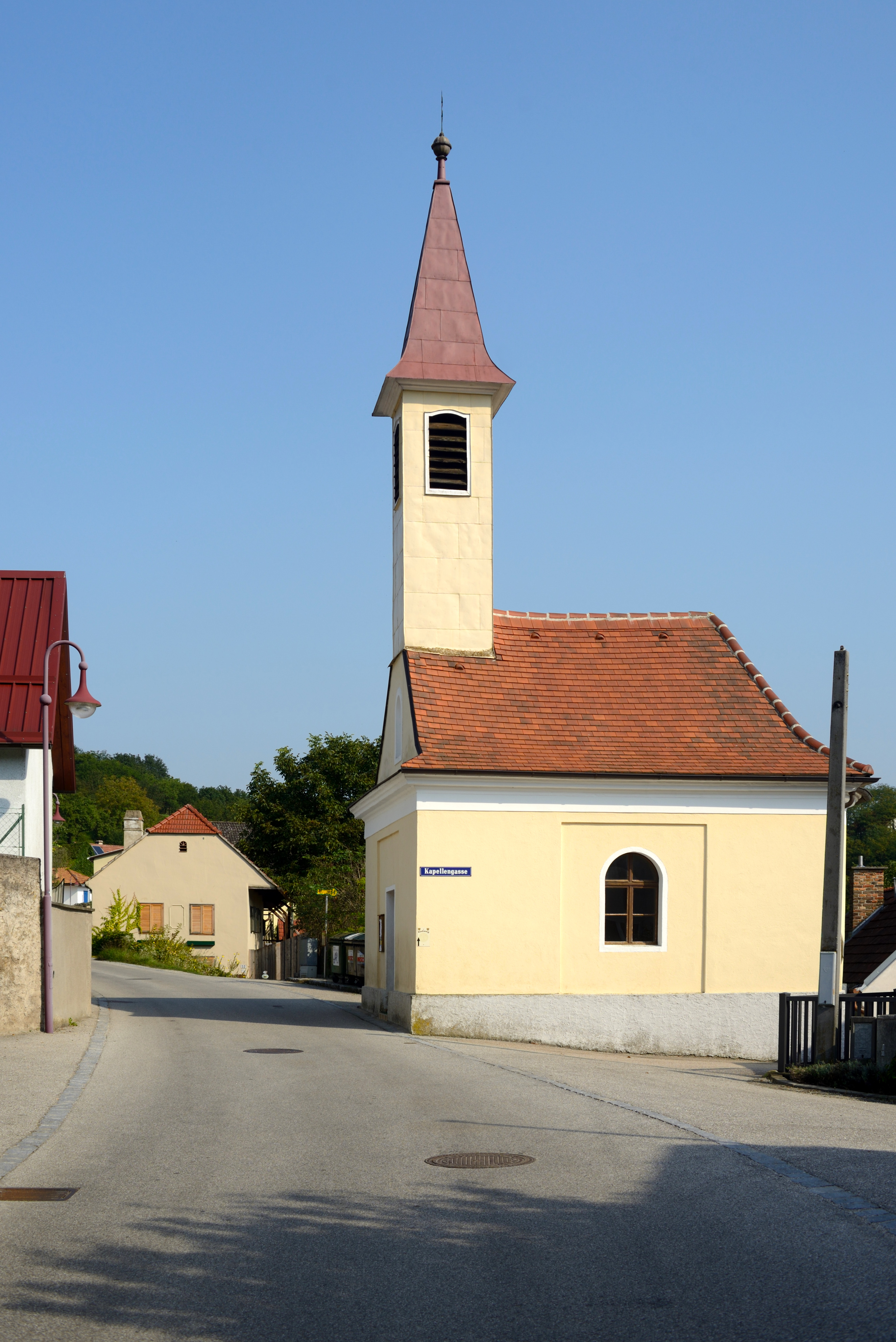
- Paudorf chapel

- Coat of arms

- Location within Austria
- Coordinates: 48°21′N 15°37′E
- Country: Austria
- State: Lower Austria
- District: Krems-Land

Government
  - Mayor: Martin Rennhofer

Area
  - Total: 30.11 km^{2} (11.63 sq mi)
- Elevation: 257 m (843 ft)

Population (2018-01-01)
  - Total: 2,598
  - Density: 86.28/km^{2} (223.5/sq mi)
- Time zone: UTC+1 (CET)
  - Summer (DST): UTC+2 (CEST)
- Postal code: 3508
- Area code: 02736
- Website: www.paudorf.at

Paudorf is a town in the district of Krems-Land in the Austrian state of Lower Austria.

== Population ==
Historical population
Year	Pop.	±%
1869	1,367	—
1880	1,434	+4.9%
1890	1,399	−2.4%
1900	1,510	+7.9%
1910	1,568	+3.8%
1923	1,576	+0.5%
1934	1,738	+10.3%
1939	1,762	+1.4%
1951	1,805	+2.4%
1961	1,856	+2.8%
1971	1,907	+2.7%
1981	2,109	+10.6%
1991	2,249	+6.6%
2001	2,389	+6.2%
2011	2,446	+2.4%
2021	2,577	+5.4%
