= Furth bei Göttweig =

- Municipality
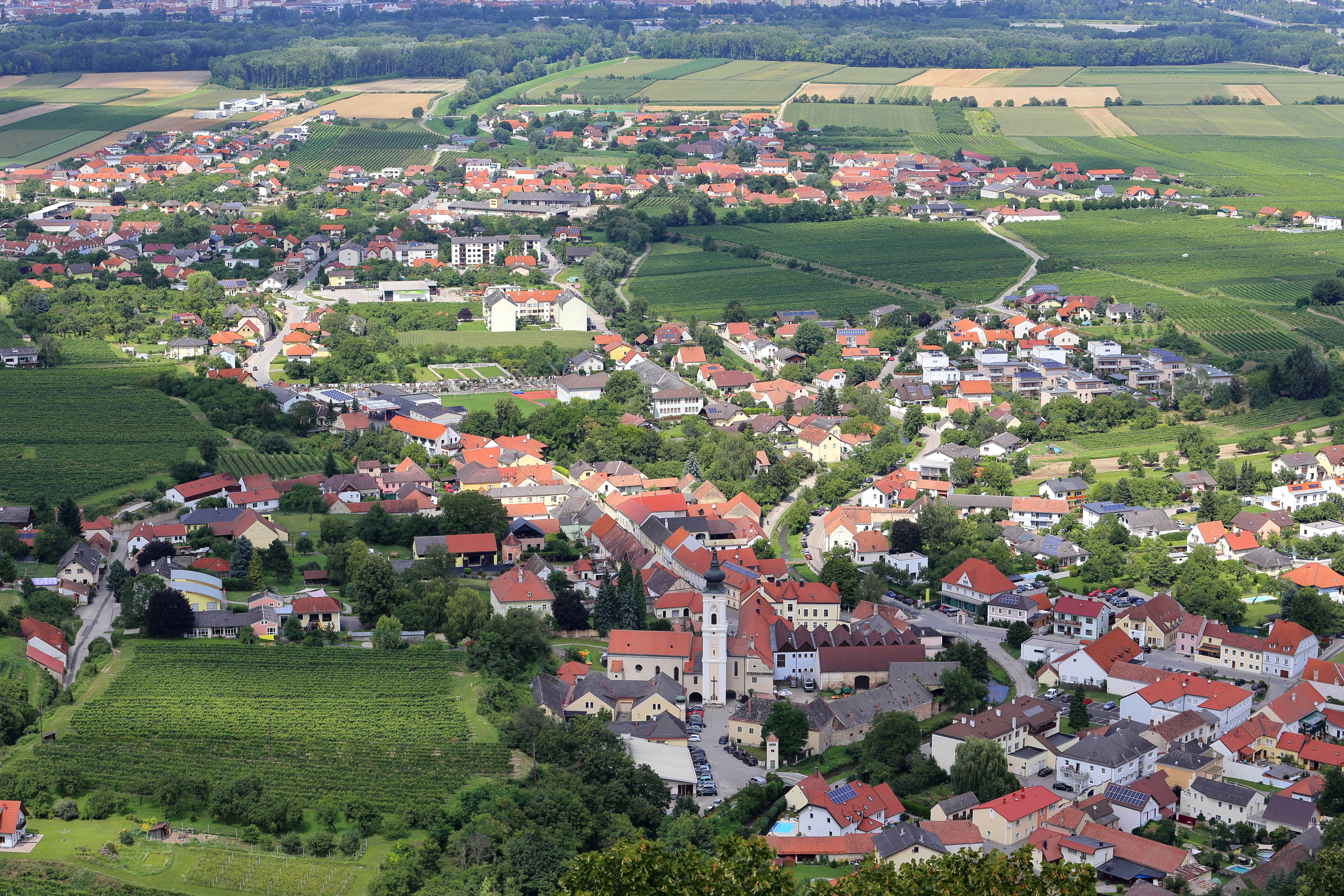
- Furth bei Göttweig

- Coat of arms

- Location within Austria
- Coordinates: 48°22′N 15°36′E
- Country: Austria
- State: Lower Austria
- District: Krems-Land

Government
  - Mayor: Gudrun Berger (ÖVP)

Area
  - Total: 12.42 km^{2} (4.80 sq mi)
- Elevation: 214 m (702 ft)

Population (2018-01-01)
  - Total: 2,956
  - Density: 238.0/km^{2} (616.4/sq mi)
- Time zone: UTC+1 (CET)
  - Summer (DST): UTC+2 (CEST)
- Postal code: 3511
- Area code: 02732
- Website: www.furth.at

Furth bei Göttweig is a town and municipality in the district of Krems-Land in the Austrian state of Lower Austria. The municipality consists of the following populated places:

- Aigen
- Furth bei Göttweig
- Klein-Wien
- Oberfucha
- Palt
- Steinaweg
- Stift Göttweig.

== Population ==
Historical population
Year	Pop.	±%
1971	2,051	—
1981	2,289	+11.6%
1991	2,471	+8.0%
2001	2,726	+10.3%
2011	2,911	+6.8%
2021	2,964	+1.8%

== Twin towns ==
Furth bei Göttweig is twinned with:

- Domažlice, Czech Republic
- Furth im Wald, Germany
- Ludres, France
