= Stratzing =

- Municipality
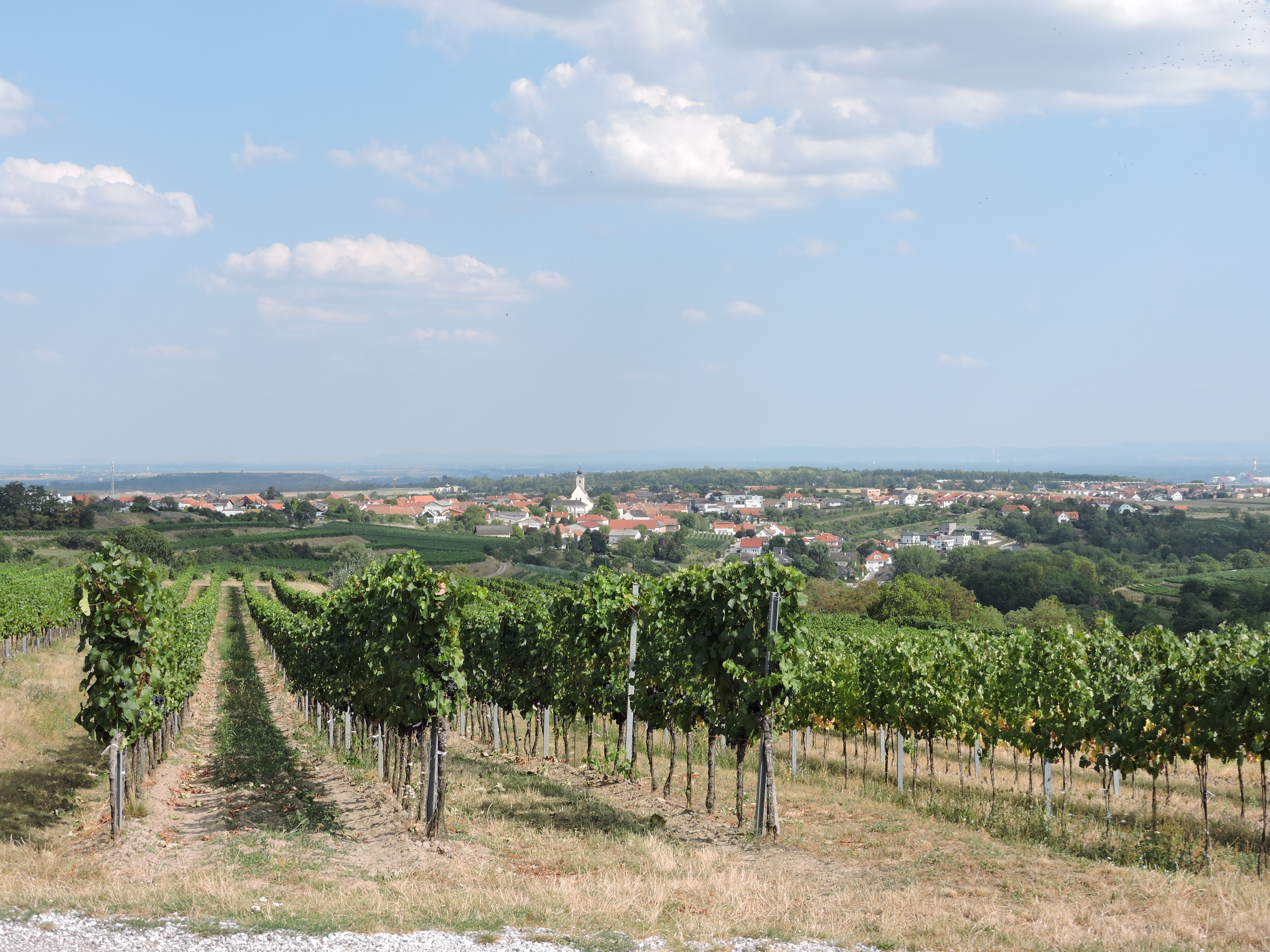
- View from vineyard

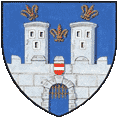
- Coat of arms

- Location within Austria
- Coordinates: 48°27′N 15°36′E
- Country: Austria
- State: Lower Austria
- District: Krems-Land

Government
  - Mayor: Josef Schmid (ÖVP)

Area
  - Total: 5.86 km^{2} (2.26 sq mi)
- Elevation: 352 m (1,155 ft)

Population (2018-01-01)
  - Total: 827
  - Density: 141/km^{2} (366/sq mi)
- Time zone: UTC+1 (CET)
  - Summer (DST): UTC+2 (CEST)
- Postal code: 3552
- Area code: 02719
- Website: www.stratzing.at

Stratzing is a town in the district of Krems-Land in the Austrian state of Lower Austria.

== Population ==
Historical population
Year	Pop.	±%
1971	508	—
1981	520	+2.4%
1991	691	+32.9%
2001	797	+15.3%
2011	807	+1.3%
2021	906	+12.3%
