= Lichtenau im Waldviertel =

- Municipality
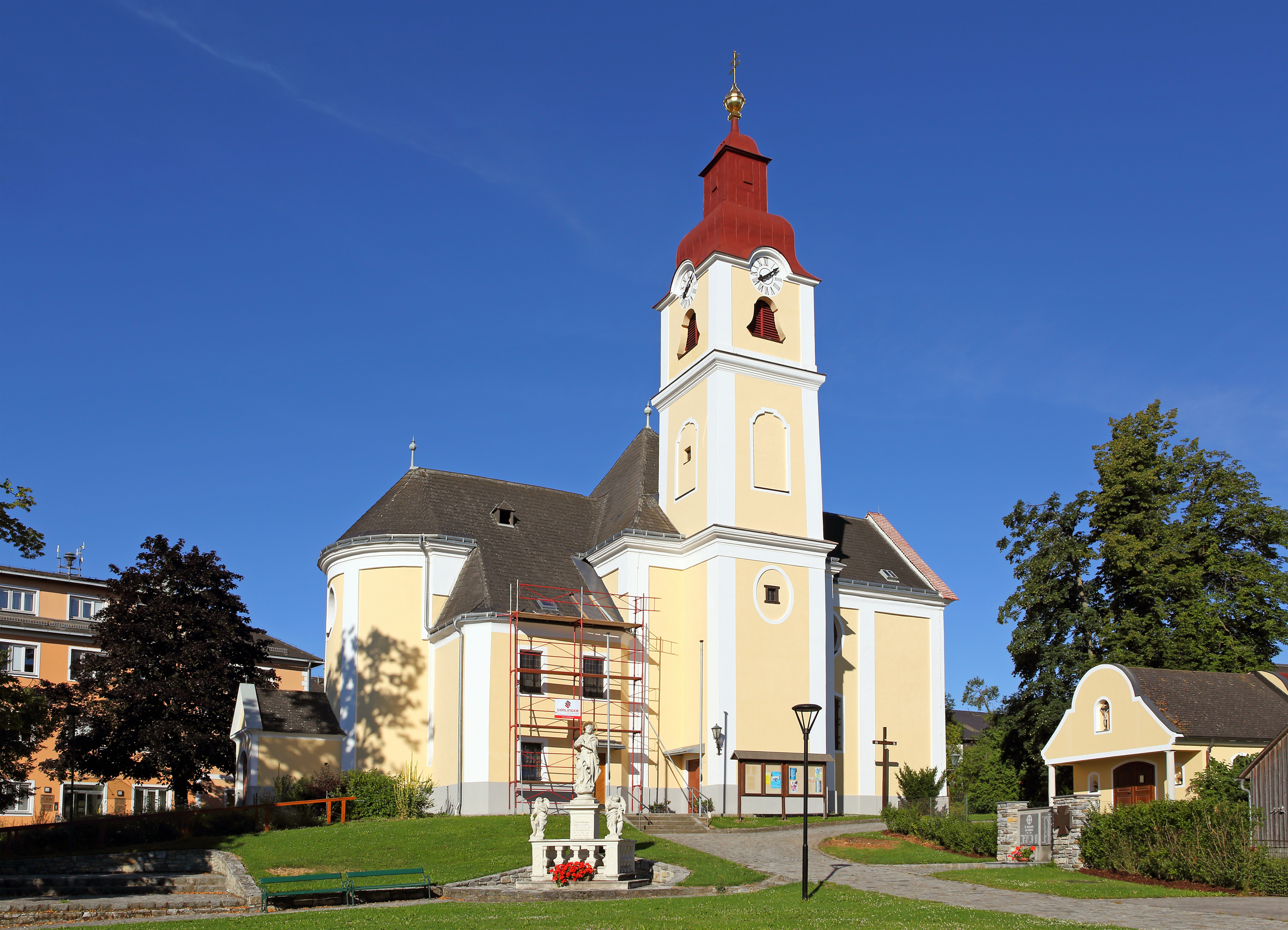
- Parish Church of Saint Giles in Lichtenau

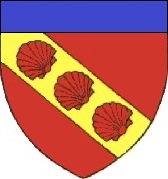
- Coat of arms

- Location within Austria
- Coordinates: 48°30′N 15°23′E
- Country: Austria
- State: Lower Austria
- District: Krems-Land

Government
  - Mayor: Andreas Pichler (ÖVP)

Area
  - Total: 58.38 km^{2} (22.54 sq mi)
- Elevation: 639 m (2,096 ft)

Population (2018-01-01)
  - Total: 2,049
  - Density: 35.10/km^{2} (90.90/sq mi)
- Time zone: UTC+1 (CET)
  - Summer (DST): UTC+2 (CEST)
- Postal code: 3522
- Area code: 02718
- Website: https://www.lichtenau.gv.at/

Lichtenau im Waldviertel is a town in the district of Krems-Land in the Austrian state of Lower Austria.

== Population ==
Historical population
Year	Pop.	±%
1971	2,304	—
1981	2,205	−4.3%
1991	2,085	−5.4%
2001	2,067	−0.9%
2011	2,037	−1.5%
2021	2,058	+1.0%
