= Gföhl =

- Municipality
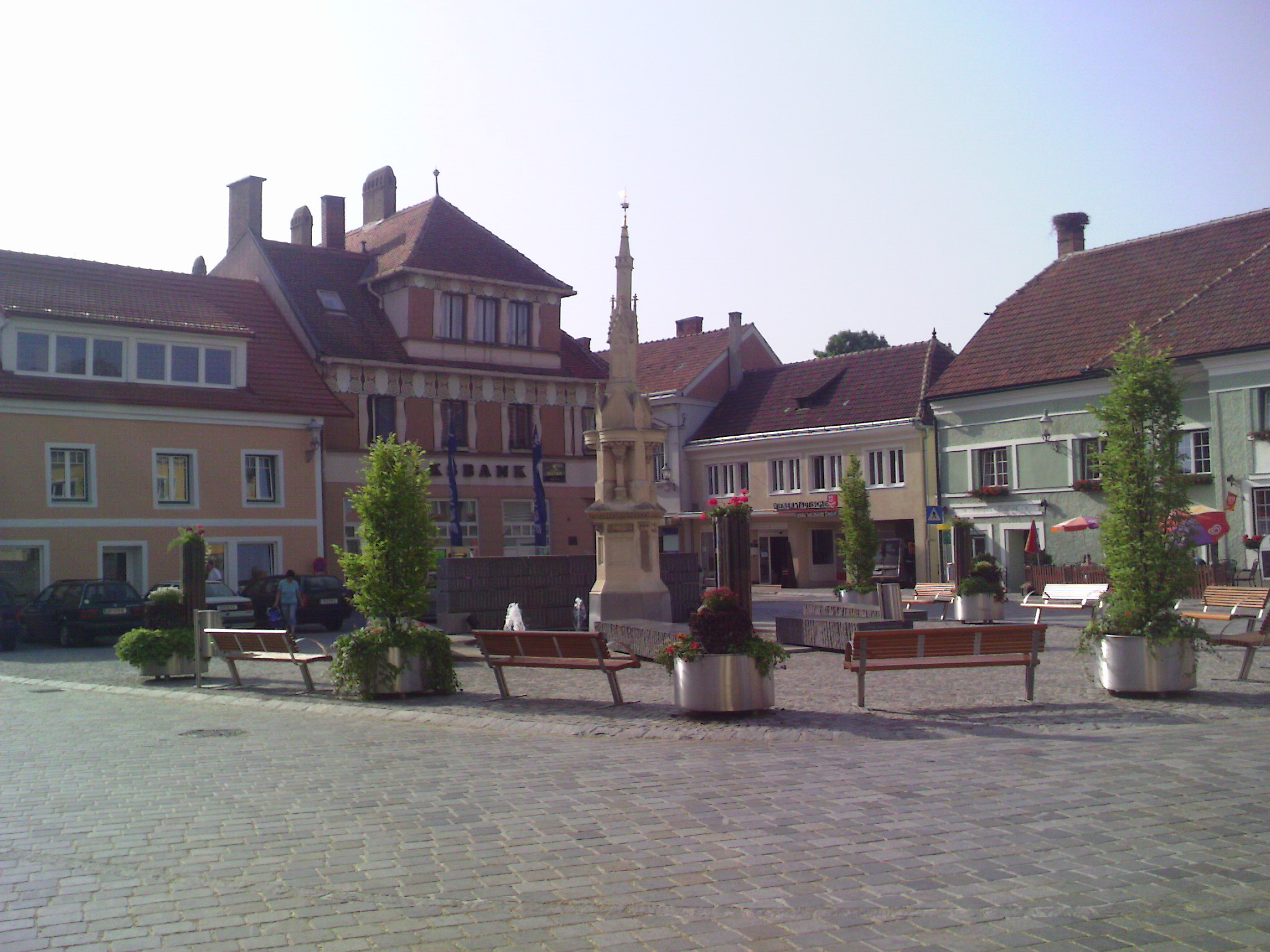
- Gföhl town center

- Coat of arms

- Location within Austria
- Coordinates: 48°31′N 15°29′E
- Country: Austria
- State: Lower Austria
- District: Krems-Land

Government
  - Mayor: Ludmilla Etzenberger, ÖVP

Area
  - Total: 80.72 km^{2} (31.17 sq mi)
- Elevation: 579 m (1,900 ft)

Population (2018-01-01)
  - Total: 3,783
  - Density: 46.87/km^{2} (121.4/sq mi)
- Time zone: UTC+1 (CET)
  - Summer (DST): UTC+2 (CEST)
- Postal code: 3542
- Area code: 02716
- Website: www.gfoehl.at

Gföhl (German pronunciation: [kføːl]) is a town and municipality in the district of Krems-Land in the Austrian state of Lower Austria.

== Population ==
Historical population
Year	Pop.	±%
1869	4,077	—
1880	4,173	+2.4%
1890	4,102	−1.7%
1900	4,038	−1.6%
1910	4,258	+5.4%
1923	4,003	−6.0%
1934	3,949	−1.3%
1939	3,921	−0.7%
1951	3,900	−0.5%
1961	3,798	−2.6%
1971	4,008	+5.5%
1981	3,776	−5.8%
1991	3,715	−1.6%
2001	3,740	+0.7%
2011	3,721	−0.5%
2021	3,767	+1.2%

== Karl Simlinger controversy ==
The acting mayor of Gföhl, Karl Simlinger, stated at city council meeting that journalists who report on asylum seekers should be hanged.
