= Straß im Straßertale =

- Municipality
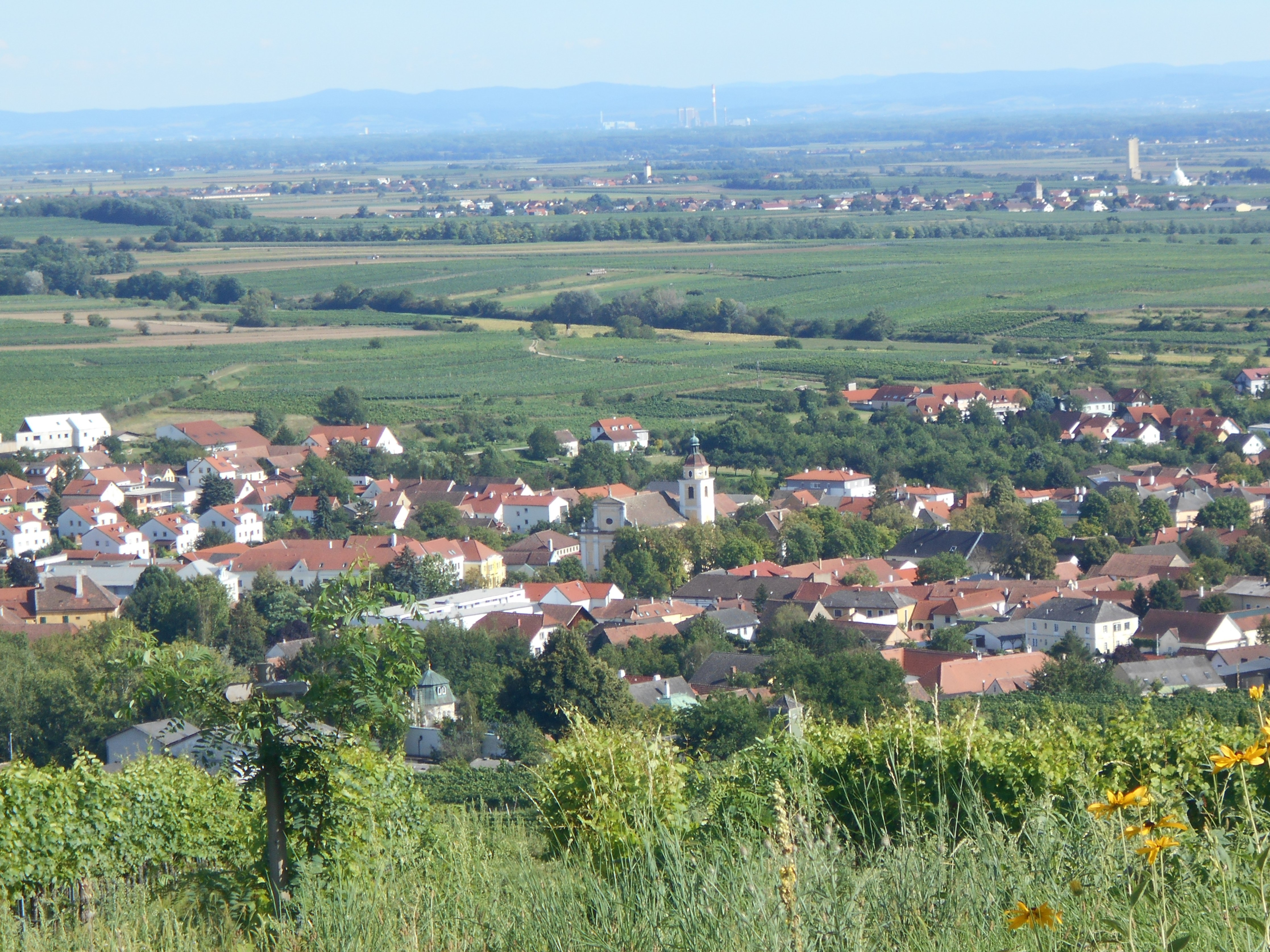
- Remote view

- Coat of arms

- Location within Austria
- Coordinates: 48°28′N 15°44′E
- Country: Austria
- State: Lower Austria
- District: Krems-Land

Government
  - Mayor: Martin Leuthner (ÖVP)

Area
  - Total: 22.49 km^{2} (8.68 sq mi)
- Elevation: 217 m (712 ft)

Population (2018-01-01)
  - Total: 1,678
  - Density: 74.61/km^{2} (193.2/sq mi)
- Time zone: UTC+1 (CET)
  - Summer (DST): UTC+2 (CEST)
- Postal code: 3491
- Area code: 02735
- Website: https://www.strassertal.at/

Straß im Straßertale is a town in the district of Krems-Land in Lower Austria in Austria.

== Population ==
Historical population
Year	Pop.	±%
1971	1,497	—
1981	1,420	−5.1%
1991	1,402	−1.3%
2001	1,465	+4.5%
2011	1,565	+6.8%
2021	1,750	+11.8%
