= Krumau am Kamp =

Town in Lower Austria, Austria

- Municipality
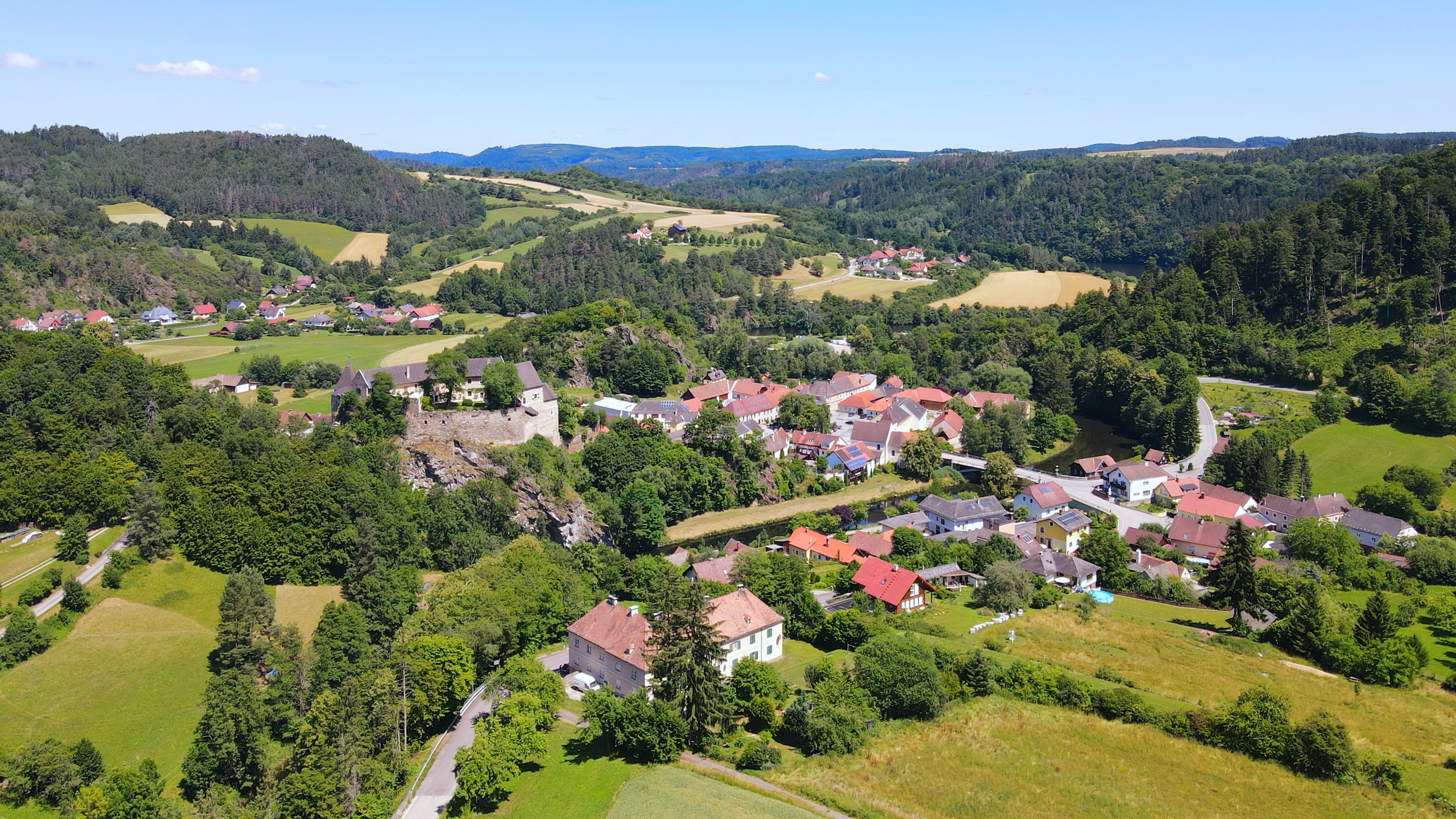
- Southwest view of Krumau am Kamp

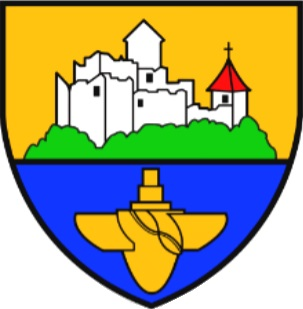
- Coat of arms

- Location within Austria
- Coordinates: 48°35′N 15°26′E
- Country: Austria
- State: Lower Austria
- District: Krems-Land

Government
  - Mayor: Erwin Warnung

Area
  - Total: 26.84 km^{2} (10.36 sq mi)
- Elevation: 370 m (1,210 ft)

Population (2018-01-01)
  - Total: 759
  - Density: 28.3/km^{2} (73.2/sq mi)
- Time zone: UTC+1 (CET)
  - Summer (DST): UTC+2 (CEST)
- Postal code: 3543
- Area code: 02731
- Website: www.krumau.at

Krumau am Kamp is a town in the district of Krems-Land in the Austrian state of Lower Austria. It is located in the Waldviertel region.

It was the birthplace of the naturalist and army officer Christoph Feldegg (1779–1845).

== Population ==
Historical population
Year	Pop.	±%
1971	1,041	—
1981	889	−14.6%
1991	827	−7.0%
2001	806	−2.5%
2014	772	−4.2%
2025	722	−6.5%

== Geography ==
Krumau am Kamp lies within the Bohemian Massif, characterized by forested hills and deep valleys carved by the Kamp River. The municipality includes several Katastralgemeinden (cadastral communities):

- Eisenberg
- Idolsberg
- Krumau am Kamp
- Tiefenbach

The area is popular for hiking and nature excursions, with scenic views and diverse flora and fauna.

== History ==
The town's most prominent historical feature is Burg Krumau am Kamp, a medieval hilltop castle dating to the 11th–12th century. Originally built as a strategic fortress by the Babenbergs, it later served as a noble residence and underwent several architectural transformations.

- In the 13th century, Margarete of Babenberg, Duchess of Austria, lived and died in the castle.
- Over time, the castle fell into partial ruin but it remains a cultural landmark.

== Culture and events ==
Krumau am Kamp maintains local traditions and hosts seasonal events that reflect the rural traditions of the Waldviertel.
