= Dunkelsteinerwald =

Mountain range in Lower Austria

Coordinates: 48.3086°N 15.5242°E

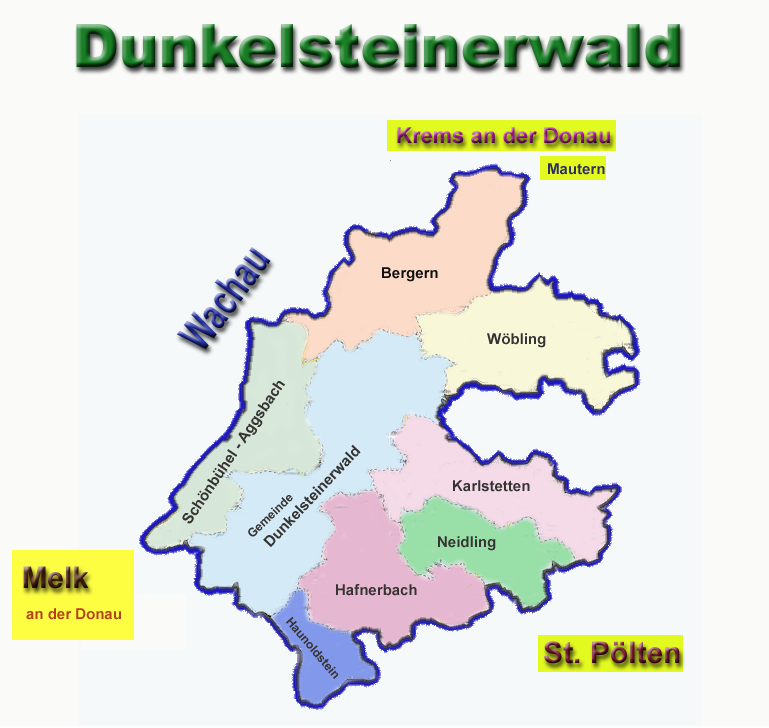
Region Dunkelsteinerwald

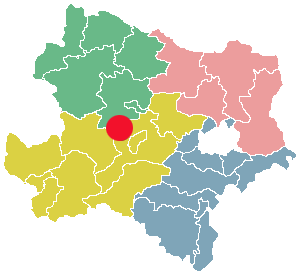
Place inLower Austria

The Dunkelsteinerwald is a hill country south of the Danube in the Mostviertel region of Lower Austria. It is located at the shore of the Danube between Melk and Mautern, south of Krems.

The principal towns of the region are Bergern im Dunkelsteinerwald, Langegg with a pilgrimage church, Wöbling, Karlstetten, Neidling, Hafnerbach, Gansbach, Gerolding, Mauer bei Melk, Dunkelsteinerwald, Haunoldstein and Schönbühel-Aggsbach.

Geologically, the Dunkelsteinerwald hills are foothills of the Waldviertel, an upland in the northwest of Lower Austria north of the Danube river and thus belonging to the Bohemian Massif. The landscape reaches elevations up to 700m above sea level and is shaped by forestry and agriculture. Dunkelsteinerwald's climate is rougher clear than that of adjacent Wachau. Trade and industry are present only to a small extent. Thus, many inhabitants commute to the district capitals of Krems, St. Pölten and Melk.

== Notable sights ==
- Burgruine Hohenegg castle
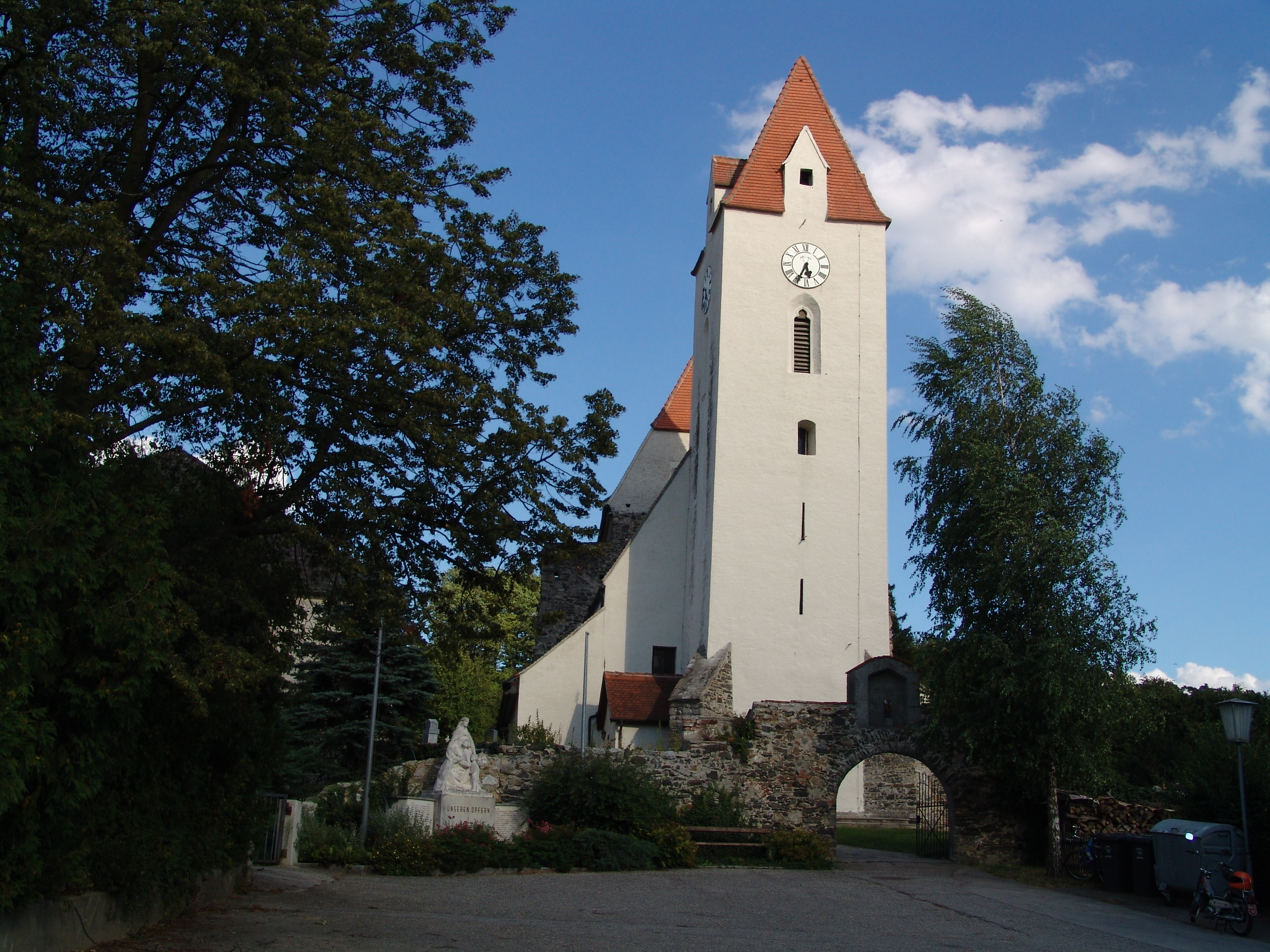
Church Mauer bei Melk

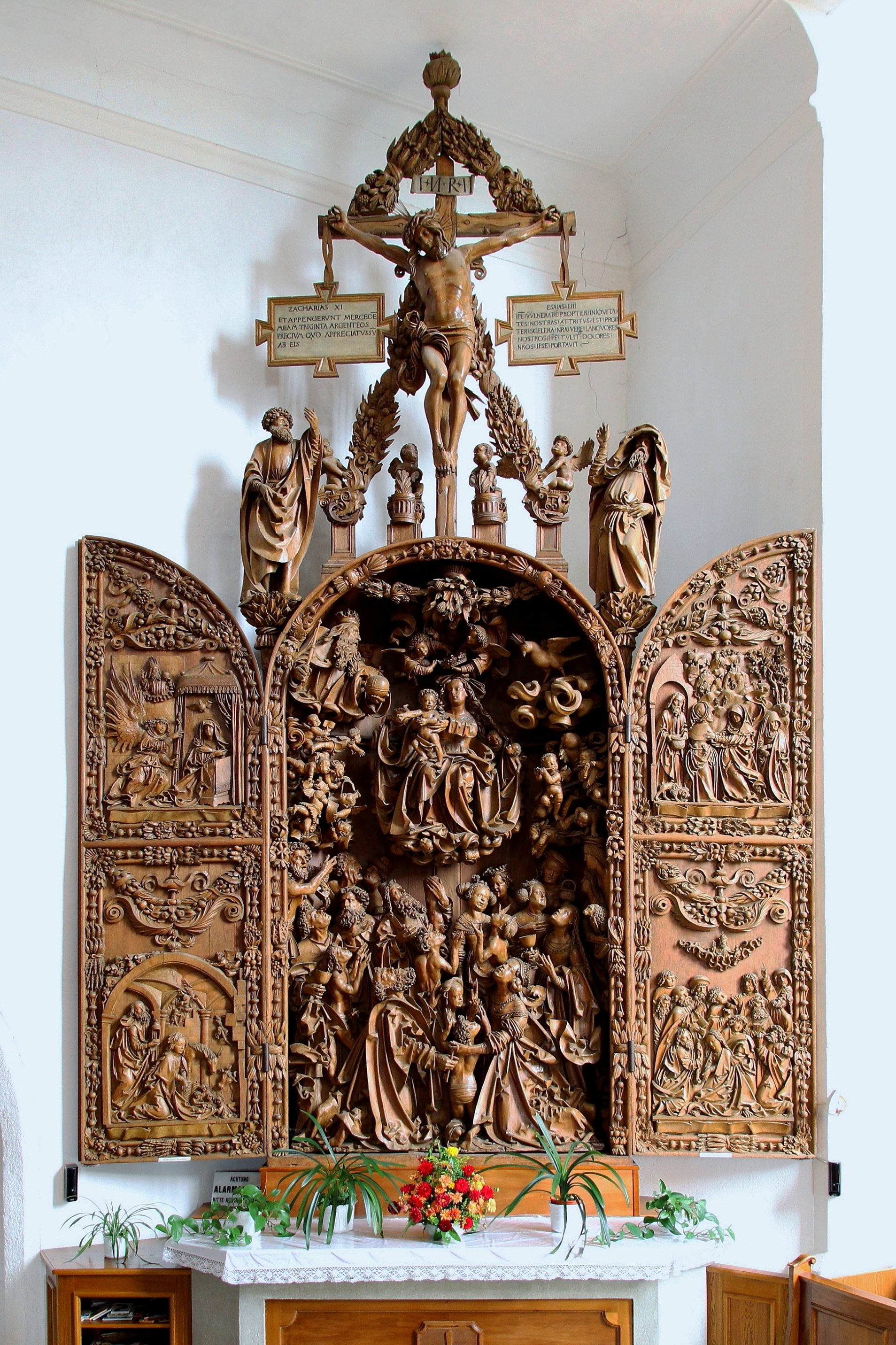
Carving altar

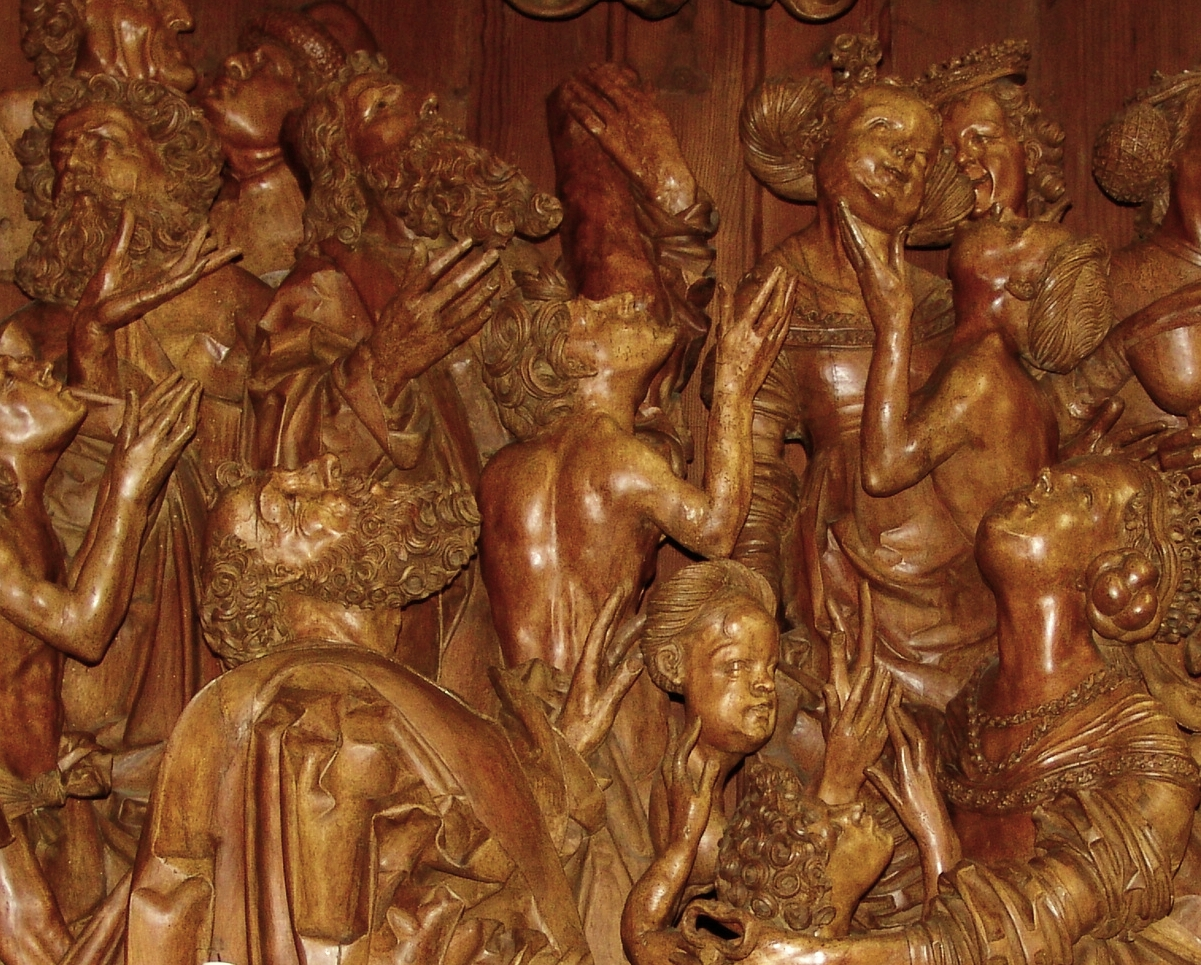
part of Carving altar

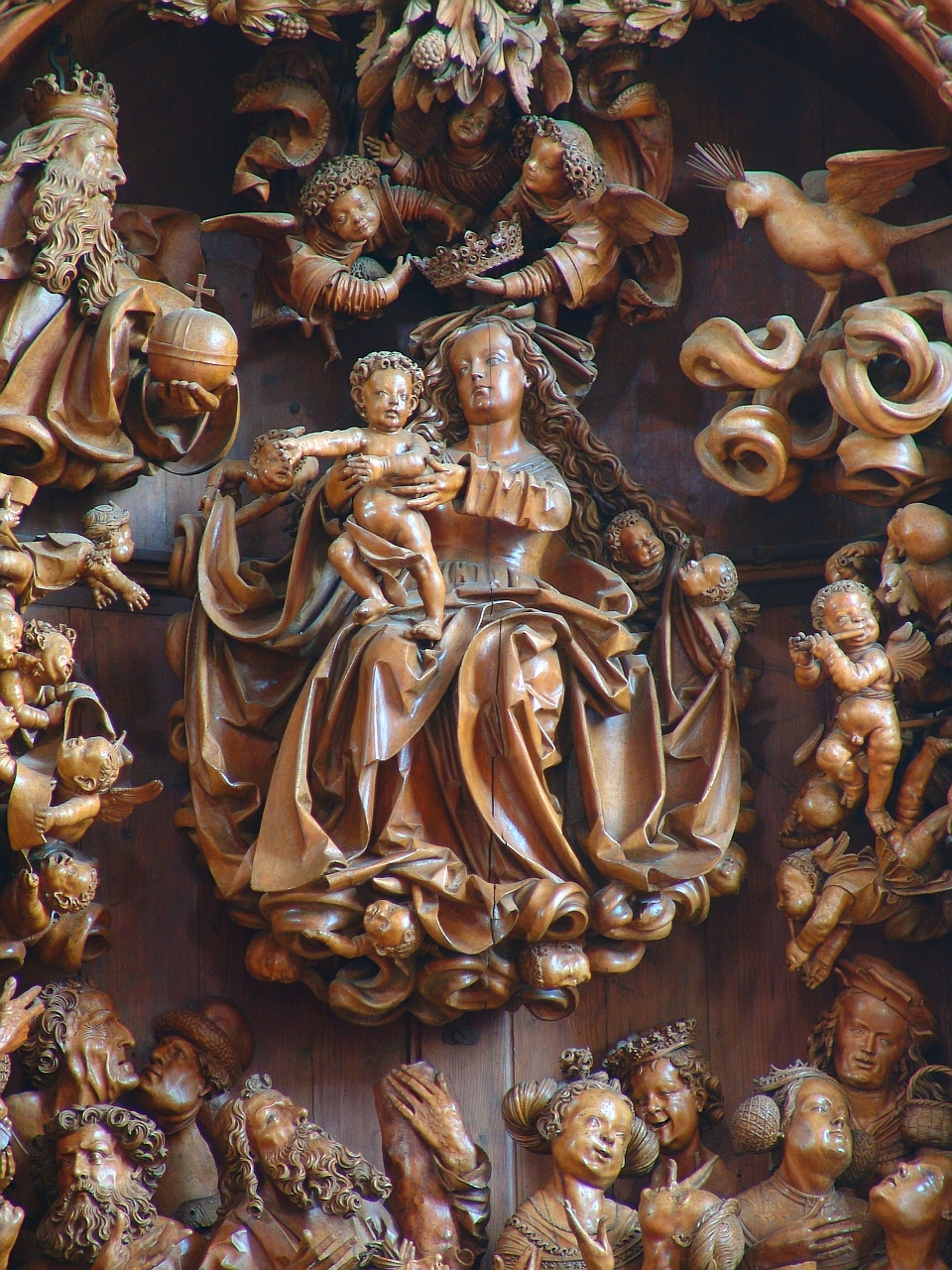

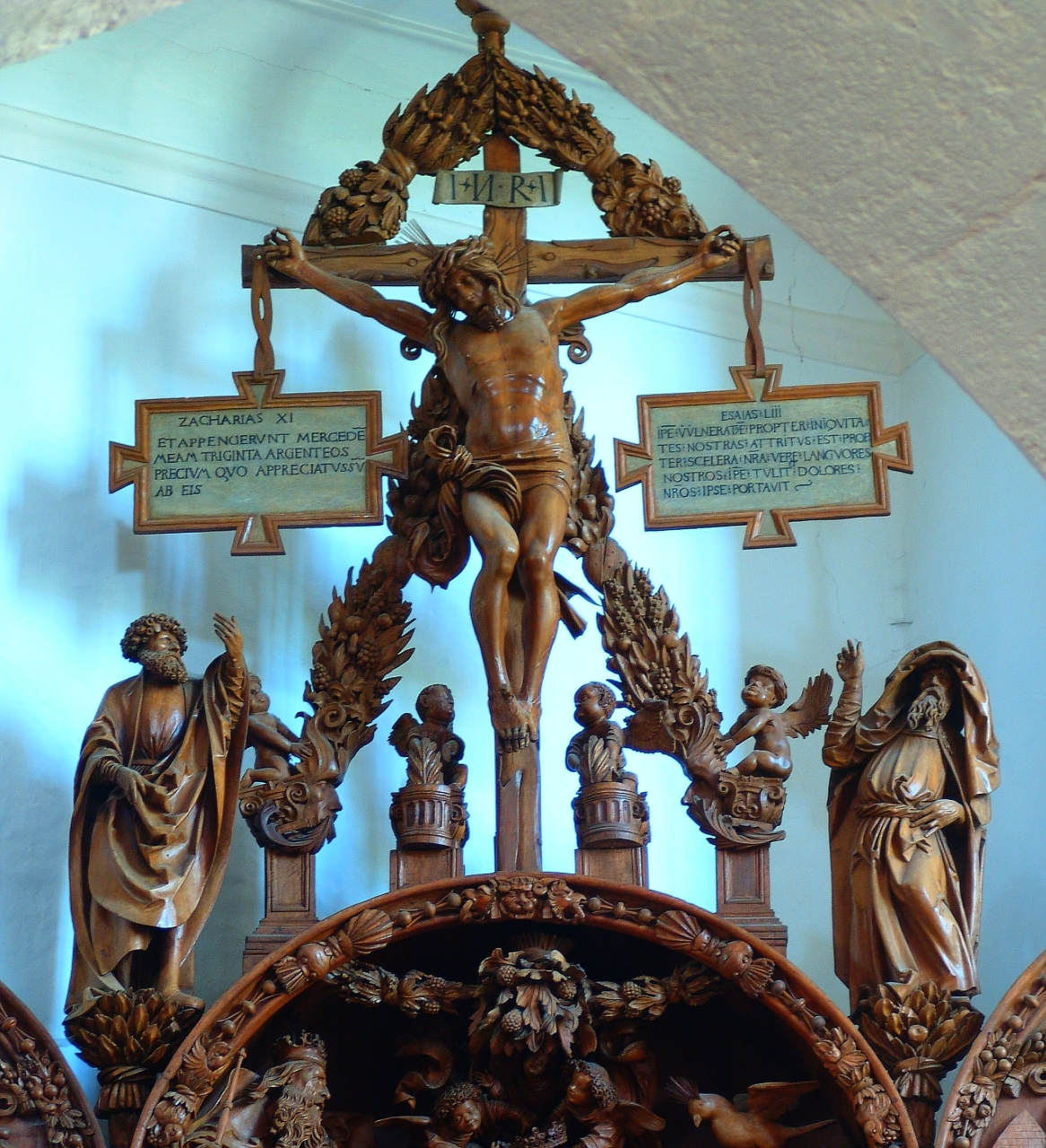

Sakramenthäuschen

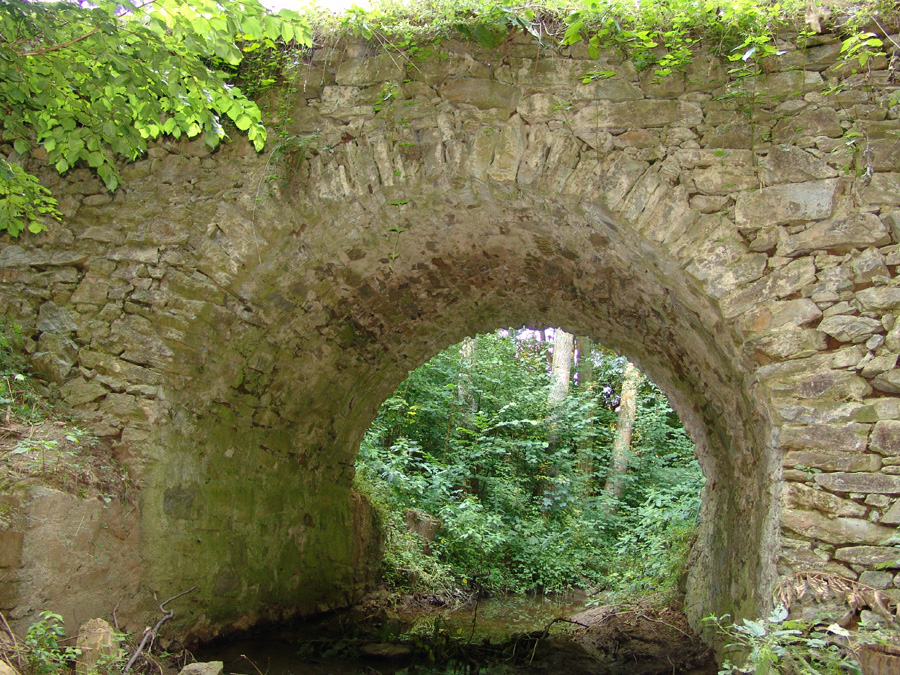
Roman bridge near Lanzing

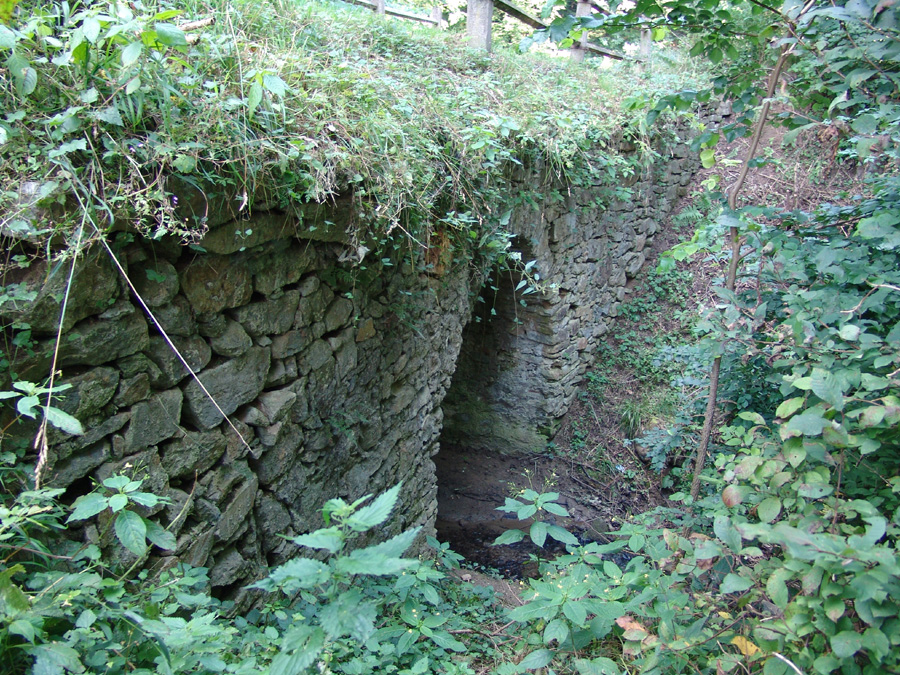
Roman bridge

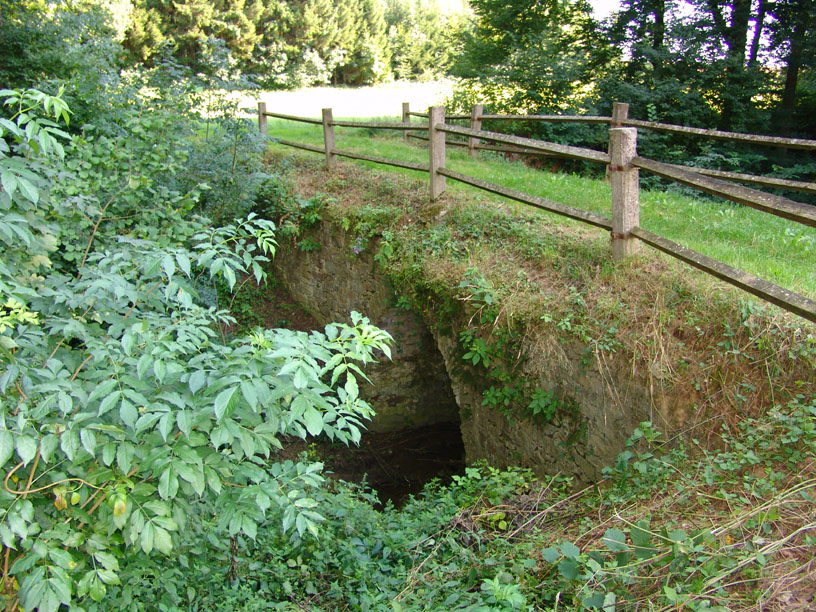
Roman bridge
