= Petzenkirchen =

- Municipality
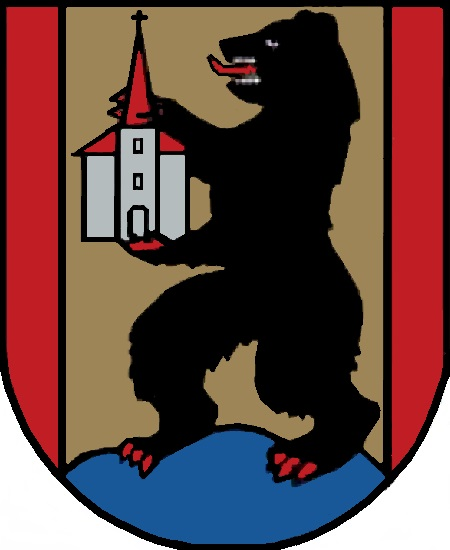
- Coat of arms

- Location within Austria
- Coordinates: 48°9′N 15°9′E
- Country: Austria
- State: Lower Austria
- District: Melk

Government
  - Mayor: Lisbeth Kern

Area
  - Total: 2.92 km^{2} (1.13 sq mi)
- Elevation: 258 m (846 ft)

Population (2018-01-01)
  - Total: 1,311
  - Density: 449/km^{2} (1,160/sq mi)
- Time zone: UTC+1 (CET)
  - Summer (DST): UTC+2 (CEST)
- Postal code: 3252
- Area code: 07416
- Website: www.petzenkirchen.at

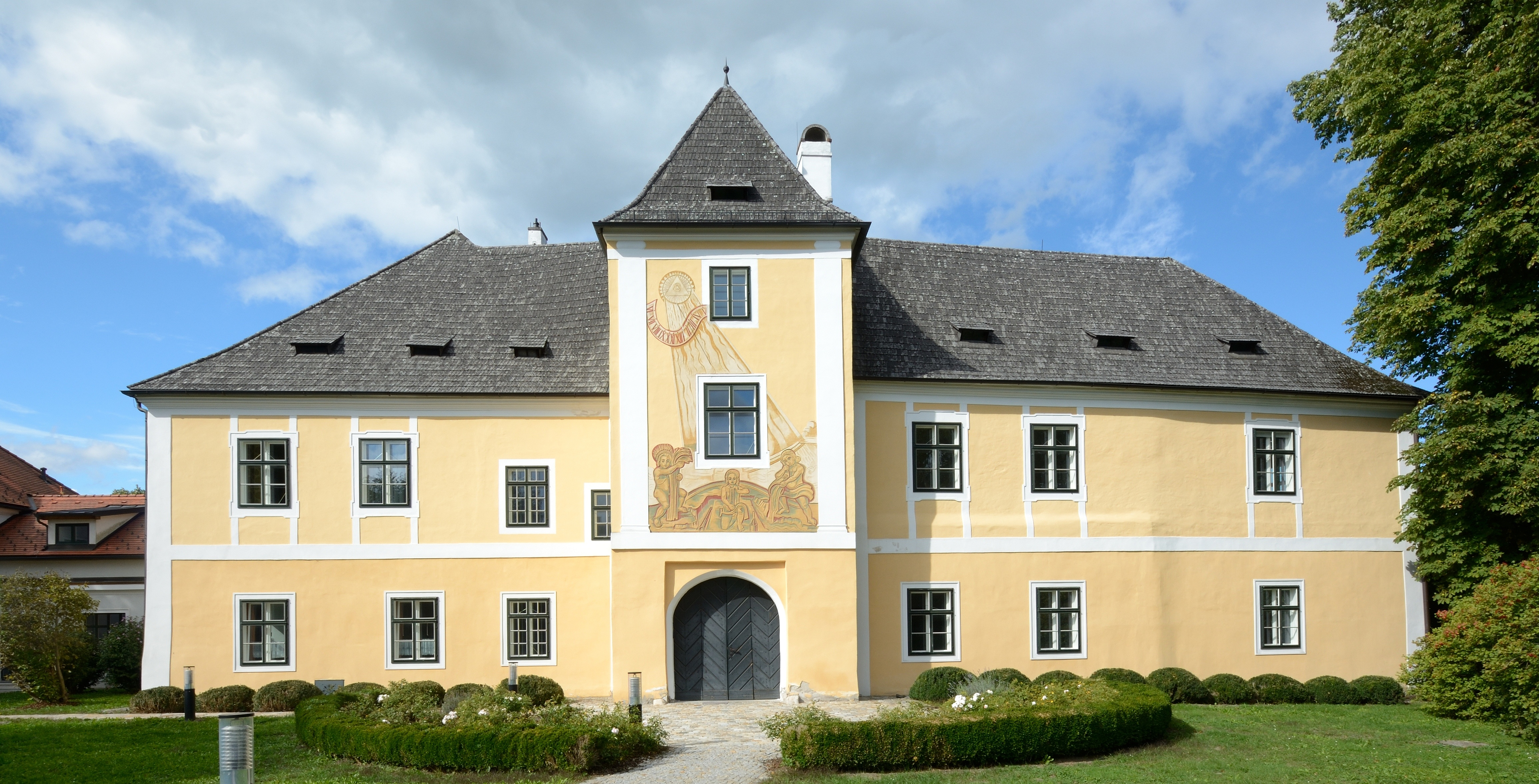
Castle of Petzenkirchen

Petzenkirchen is a market town in the district of Melk in the Austrian state of Lower Austria.

== Population ==
Historical population
Year	Pop.	±%
1971	1,098	—
1981	1,163	+5.9%
1991	1,177	+1.2%
2001	1,296	+10.1%

== Geography ==
Petzenkirchen is located in the Mostviertel which is part of Lower Austria. The area of the market town is 2.89 square kilometres. Adjacent municipalities are the town of Wieselburg and the village of Bergland.
