= Johann Kastenberger =

Bank robber (1958–1988)

Johann Kastenberger (1 October 1958 – 15 November 1988) was an Austrian marathon runner, bank robber and murderer who was born in Sankt Leonhard am Forst and died in Sankt Pölten, Lower Austria. He committed his crimes while wearing a Ronald Reagan mask, earning him the nickname Pumpgun Ronnie. Kastenberger's criminal life was the basis for the 2010 film The Robber.

== Robberies ==
On January 25, 1977, Kastenberger robbed a Volksbank branch in Pressbaum, making off with 70,000 Austrian schillings (approximately €5,000). Shortly thereafter, police arrested Kastenberger on a train at Wien Westbahnhof based on descriptions provided by the bank's employees. He served a seven-year prison sentence for the robbery. Upon his release, he moved in with his girlfriend in the Simmering district of Vienna.

On August 13, 1985, Kastenberger attempted to rob the Raiffeisen Bank in Hafnerbach but had to flee without taking any money. The police immediately suspected Kastenberger, but his girlfriend provided him with a false alibi. On November 20, 1987, he successfully robbed the Raiffeisen Bank in Haunoldstein, escaping with 88,000 schillings (approximately €6,400). On February 19, 1988, he robbed three banks in succession, making off with a combined total of more than 1.8 million schillings (approximately €133,000). His largest haul occurred on March 21, 1988, at a Länderbank branch in Vienna, where he stole two million schillings (approximately €145,000). Over the next two days, he robbed two more banks in Vienna, netting one million schillings from each.

== Murders ==
On August 13, 1985, the same day he committed his first bank robbery after being released from prison, Kastenberger shot and killed Ewald Pollhammer, a 28-year-old man from Upper Austria. The incident stemmed from an ongoing conflict between the two during a vocational training course.

Additionally, Kastenberger is regarded as the prime suspect in three other murders:

- Kastenberger is suspected of having robbed a gas station in Purkersdorf on May 26, 1984, and shooting and killing 51-year-old station attendant Helene Bubendorfer with an assault rifle.
- Kastenberger is suspected of using an assault rifle to kill officer Friedrich Roger in front of a police station in Vienna on July 25, 1986.
- Kastenberger is suspected of using a stolen government service weapon to kill Brigitte Hranka, who worked as a prostitute.

== Arrest, flight and death ==
On November 11, 1988, Kastenberger was arrested and indicted for numerous crimes. During the investigation, authorities found two keys in his apartment for safe deposit boxes containing nearly 5.5 million Schillings (approximately €400,000). Two days later, during his confession proceedings, he jumped out of a first-floor window, landed on the hood of a parked car, and escaped.

The following day, he attempted to steal a woman's car in Gaaden but fled when a police patrol passed by. The next day, in Maria Enzersdorf, he overpowered a man, bound him, and stole his car. The man managed to free himself and alerted the police, who soon discovered the stolen vehicle on the motorway. Kastenberger noticed the police, pulled over to the guardrail, and fled through the woods, where he stole another vehicle in Waasen and escaped via the West Highway. Near Sankt Pölten, he broke through a roadblock and was shot in the back. Before he could be apprehended by the police, Kastenberger took his own life with a gunshot to the head.

The pursuit of Kastenberger was the largest investigation in Austria's post-war history, involving more than 450 officers.

== Other ==
Kastenberger was a successful marathon runner in Austria during the 1980s, winning several national races. In 1988, he set a record in the Kainach Mountain Marathon with a time of 3:16:07.

In 2009, director Benjamin Heisenberg dramatized Kastenberger's career as a runner and bank robber in his film The Robber. Andreas Lust starred in the title role. The film was based on Martin Prinz's 2002 novel of the same name, which was translated into English in 2005 by Mike Mitchell and renamed On the Run. The film premiered in February 2010 at the 60th Berlin Film Festival.
