= Nölling =

Settlement in Dunkelsteinerwald, Austria

Coordinates: 48°15′N 15°26′E

Nölling is a settlement in the municipality of Dunkelsteinerwald in Melk District, Lower Austria in northeastern Austria.‍
