= Kicking (Dunkelsteinerwald) =

Human settlement in Austria

Kicking is a settlement in the municipality of Dunkelsteinerwald in Melk District, Lower Austria in northeastern Austria.
