= Umbach =

Settlement in Dunkelsteinerwald, Austria

Umbach is a settlement in the municipality of Dunkelsteinerwald in Melk District, Lower Austria in northeastern Austria.
