= Geroldinger Wald =

Geroldinger Wald is a forest in the municipality of Dunkelsteinerwald in Melk District, Lower Austria in northeastern Austria.
