= Krapfenberg =

Settlement in Austria

Coordinates: 48°17′N 15°28′E

Krapfenberg is a settlement in the municipality of Dunkelsteinerwald in Melk District, Lower Austria in northeastern Austria.
