= Thal, Lower Austria =

Settlement in lower Austria

Coordinates: 48°13′38.64″N 15°23′41.64″E

Thal (German pronunciation: [ˈtaːl]) is a settlement in the municipality of Dunkelsteinerwald in Melk District, Lower Austria in northeastern Austria.
