= Eckartsberg =

Coordinates: 48°15′N 15°27′E

Eckartsberg is a settlement in the municipality of Dunkelsteinerwald in Melk District, Lower Austria in northeastern Austria.
