= Lottersberg =

Settlement in Melk District, Lower Austria

Coordinates: 48°16′N 15°28′E

Lottersberg is a settlement in the municipality of Dunkelsteinerwald in Melk District, Lower Austria in northeastern Austria.
