= Lerchfeld =

Lerchfeld is a settlement in the municipality of Dunkelsteinerwald in Melk District, Lower Austria in northeastern Austria.
