= Tourism in Austria =

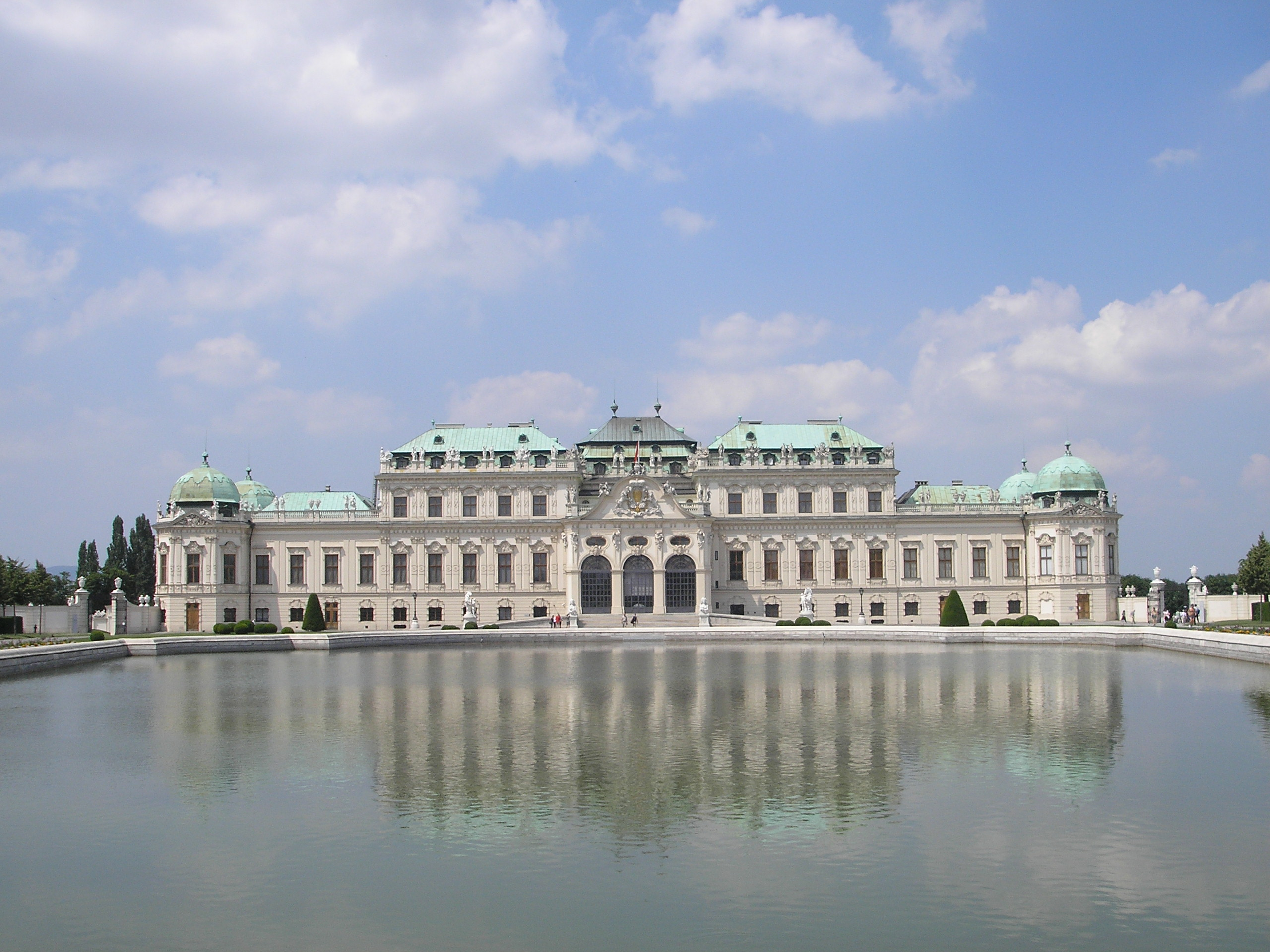
Belvedere Palace, Vienna, one of Austria's most iconic monuments

Tourism forms an important part of the economy of Austria, accounting for almost 9% of the Austrian gross domestic product. Austria has one guest bed for every six inhabitants, and boasts the highest per capita income from tourism in the Organisation for Economic Co-operation and Development. As of 2024, the total number of tourist overnight stays during the summer season is continuing to outnumber the overnight stays in the winter season. Peaks are in February and July/August.

In 2007, Austria ranked 9th worldwide in international tourism receipts, with 18.9 billion US$. In international tourist arrivals, Austria ranked 12th with 30.8 million tourists.

== Most visited areas ==
Vienna attracts a major part of tourists, both in summer and winter. Salzburg receives about a fifth of tourist overnight stays compared to Vienna, which ranks it 2nd in the summer season. In the winter season, a number of winter sport resorts in western Austria overtake Salzburg in the number of tourist overnight stays: Sölden, Saalbach-Hinterglemm, Ischgl, Sankt Anton am Arlberg, and Obertauern.

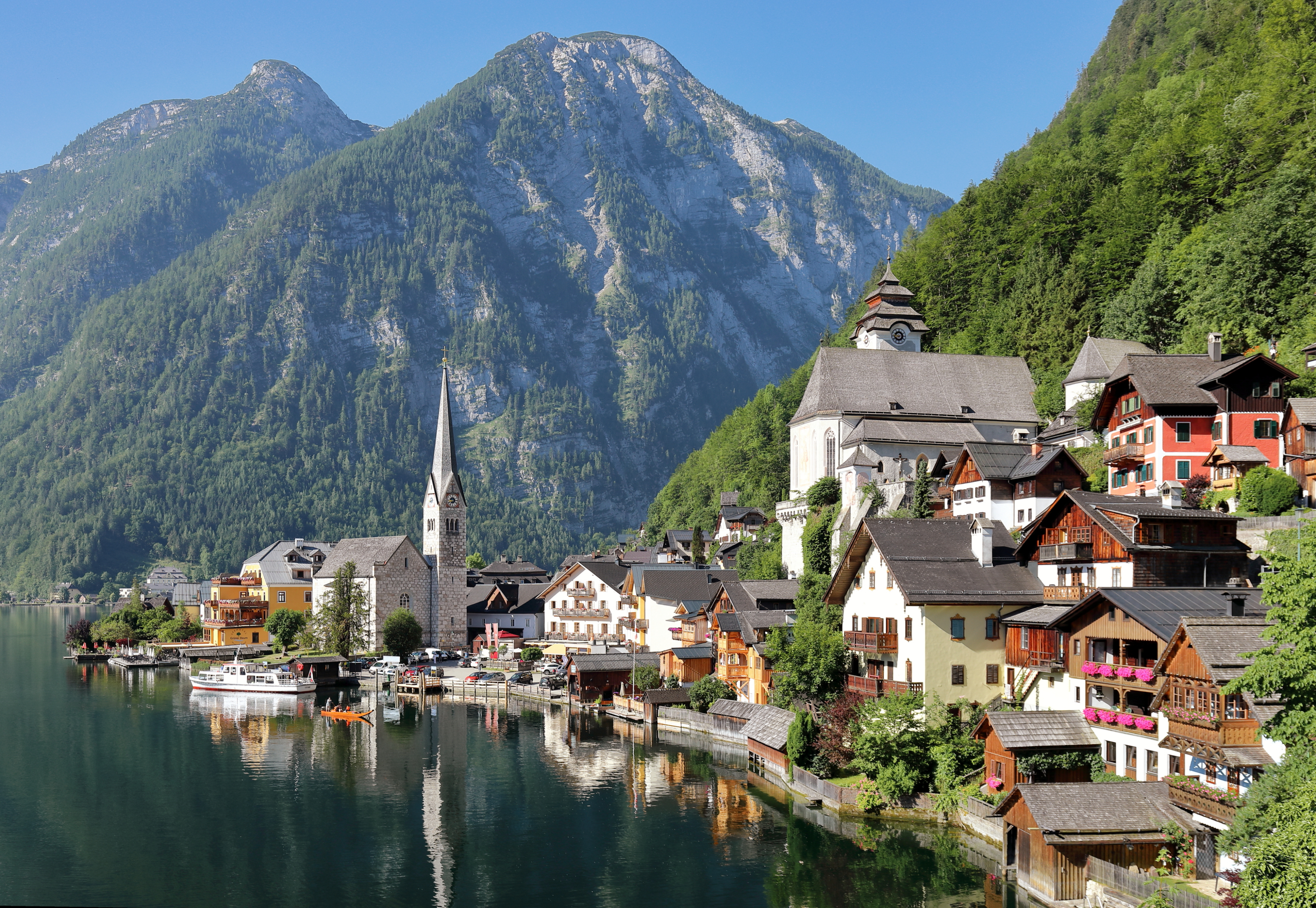
Hallstatt, one of the most visited places in Austria

Visits to Austria mostly include trips to Vienna with its cathedral, its "Heurigen" (wine pubs) and romantic Waltz music events. Worth a visit are Salzburg, birthplace of Mozart, Innsbruck, capital of Tyrol surrounded by the Alps, Linz, capital of Upper Austria with the largest Cathedral of Austria and modern cultural highlights, and the Danube valley with its vineyards, for example the Wachau or Dunkelsteinerwald, which are between Melk and Krems. In the western part of the country the province Vorarlberg reaches the Lake Constance, in the eastern part Neusiedler See. The three most visited landmarks in Austria are Schönbrunn Palace (2,590,000 visitors per year), Tiergarten Schönbrunn (2,453,987 visitors) and Mariazell Basilica (1,500,000 visitors). The small town of Hallstatt draws in roughly a million visitors per year and is often named as a negative example of Instagram tourism.

== Sports and nature ==
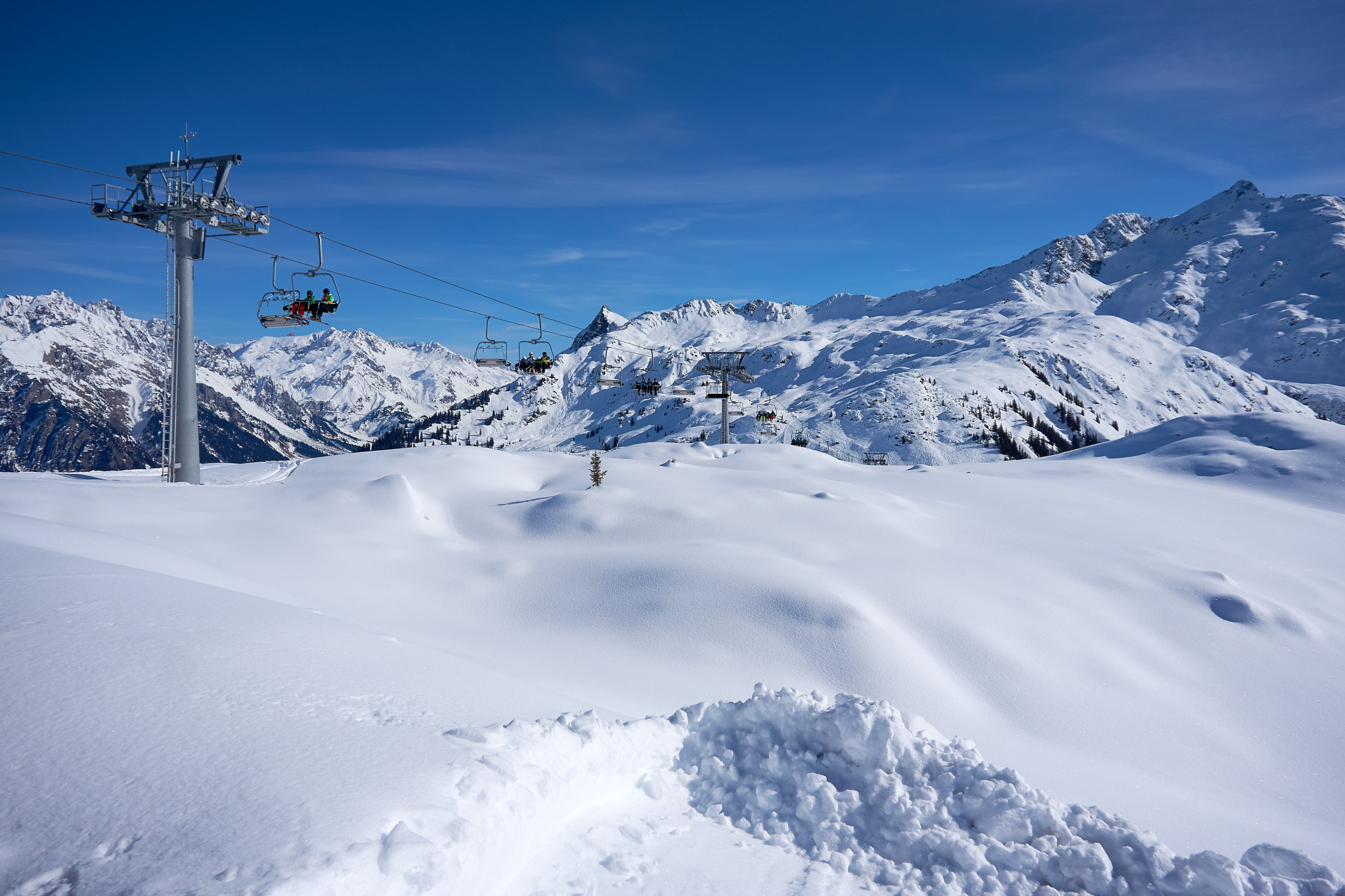
Ski Arlberg in Vorarlberg and Tyrol

Of great touristic importance are the Austrian skiing, hiking and mountaineering resorts in the Alps as well as family-friendly recreation areas and thermal spas. The same applies to the numerous Austrian lakes (e.g. Wolfgangsee and other lakes in the Salzkammergut east of Salzburg or Wörthersee in Carinthia) and castles. Stretching over Vorarlberg and Tyrol, Ski Arlberg is the largest connected ski area in Austria and one of five largest ski areas in the world.

== Art and culture ==
For visitors interested in media art, there is the Ars Electronica Center in Linz. Since 1979 this center has organized the Ars Electronica Festival and presented the Prix Ars Electronica, the worldwide highest-ranked prize for media art.

== Internationally known annual events ==
Name	Location	Date	Description
Vienna New Year's Concert	Vienna	1 January	Traditional concert for classical music
Hahnenkamm race	Kitzbühel, Tyrol	January	Ski race
Vienna Opera Ball	Vienna	Thursday preceding Ash Wednesday	Ball
Life Ball	Vienna	June	HIV and AIDS awareness event
Donauinselfest	Vienna	End of June	Biggest open air music festival in the world, free entry
Bregenzer Festspiele	Bregenz, Vorarlberg	July/August	Opera festival
Salzburg Festival	Salzburg	July/August	Opera festival
FM4 Frequency Festival	Sankt Pölten	August	Alternative rock, electronica and hip hop festival
Internationale Gartenbaumesse Tulln	Tulln, Lower Austria	End of August	Horticulture trade fair, Europe's biggest flower show
Ars Electronica Festival	Linz, Upper Austria	September	Festival devoted to technology and new media art including workshops, discussions and lectures
Viennale	Vienna	October	Film festival

== Arrivals ==
Yearly tourist arrivals in millions

Most visitors arriving to Austria on short term basis are from the following countries of nationality:

Rank	Country	2014	2015	2024
1	Germany	11,750,027	12,134,836	14,913,898
2	Netherlands	1,671,581	1,734,453	2,233,855
3	Switzerland	1,309,660	1,400,251	1,354,358
4	France	1,016,770	1,075,708	1,249,468
5	Italy	1,051,490	1,122,936	1,059,801
6	United Kingdom	802,552	875,664	920,023
7	China	497,925	715,119	374,130
8	Czech Republic	660,086	711,351	1,184,156
9	United States	632,512	708,233	942,595
10	Belgium	514,264	514,329	620,105
11	Hungary	493,055	501,595	670,020
12	Poland	425,730	456,615	830,416
13	Spain	309,794	348,768	398,634
14	Denmark	264,704	331,507	390,956
15	Russia	467,565	313,406	52,728
16	South Korea	234,557	277,032	226,055
17	Romania	264,704	275,806	375,826
18	Japan	245,306	236,621	101,475
19	Sweden	205,501	224,258	225,720
20	Slovakia	176,760	194,186	301,559
Total foreign		25,291,371	26,718,945	31,903,467

== Slogans of the provinces ==
- Burgenland – The sunny side of Austria
- Carinthia – The joy of living
- Lower Austria – Feel alive!
- Upper Austria – ?
- Salzburg – Stage of the World
- Styria – The Green Heart of Austria
- Tyrol – Heart of the Alps
- Vienna – Now. Forever.
- Vorarlberg – Poetry in Nature
