= Bergland =

Bergland may refer to:

== People with the surname ==
- David Bergland (1935–2019), American libertarian activist
- Robert Bergland (1928-2018), American politician
- Tim Bergland (born 1965), American ice hockey

== Places ==
- Bergland, Austria
- Bergland, Ontario, Canada
- Bergland Township, Michigan, United States
  - Bergland, Michigan, the main village in the township
- Hegyvidék or Bergland (German), a district of Budapest, Hungary
