= Kochholz =

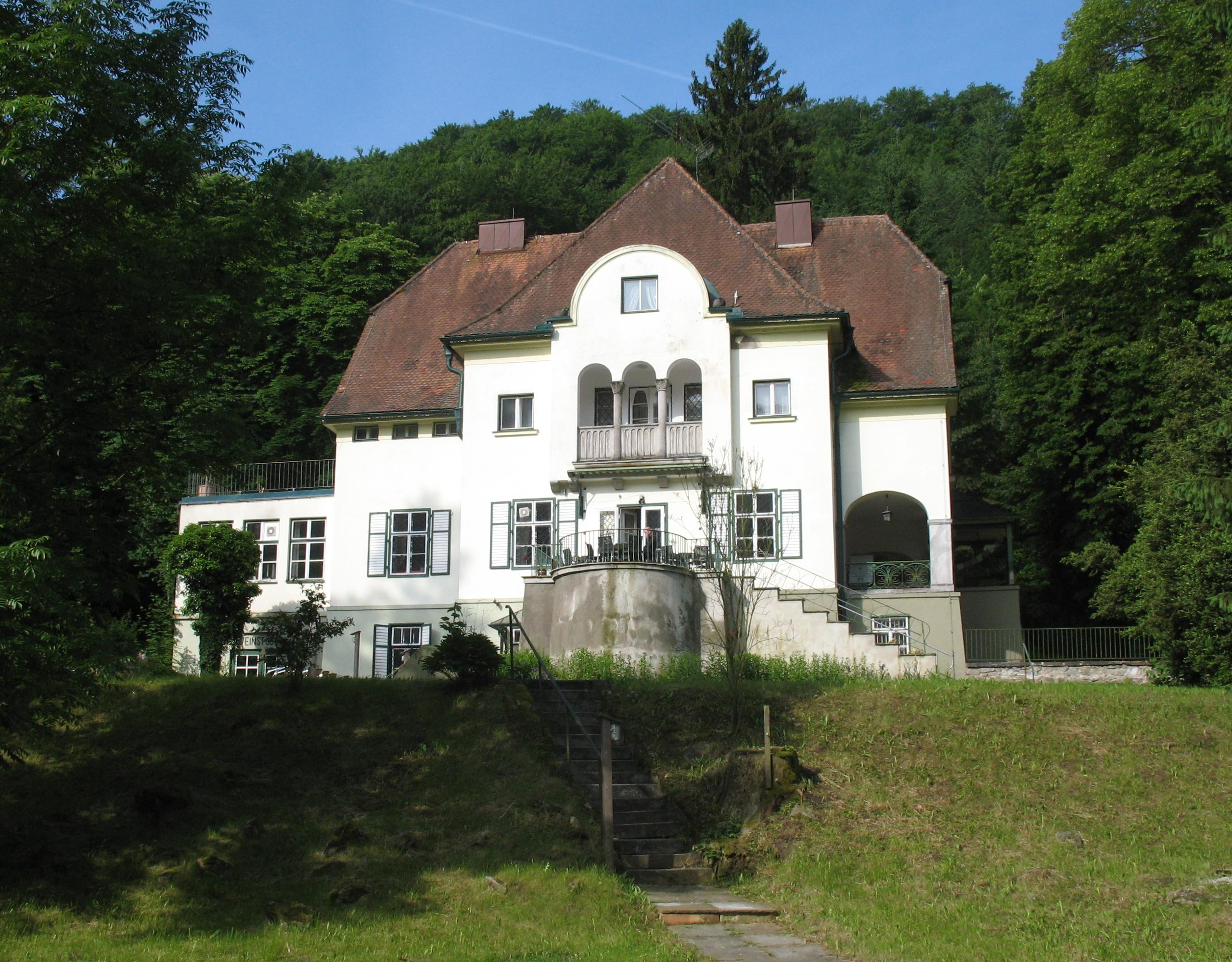
Jagdschloss Wolfstein

Kochholz is a settlement in the municipality of Dunkelsteinerwald in Melk District, Lower Austria in northeastern Austria.
