= Heinz Anger =

Austrian painter

- Heinz Anger, 1992.
- Born: Heinz Anger; 23 July 1941 (age 85); Karlstetten, Austria
- Known for: Painter
- Movement: Contemporary Impressionist

Heinz Anger (pronounced [ˈaŋɡɐ]; born 23 July 1941 in Karlstetten, Lower Austria) is an Austrian painter of landscapes, portraits, still lifes and figurative compositions.

Anger’s work is noted for its impressionistic atmosphere, his use of light and bold application of colours.

== Biography ==
From 1945 Heinz attended elementary and primary school in Favoriten, a district of Vienna, Austria. In 1955 he started studying at the Graphische Lehr- und Versuchsanstalt ("Die Graphische"), the college for graphics and media in Vienna. His teachers included Professor Karl Zecho (1896–1965) and Rudolf Reinkenhof (1905–1980).

From 1959 he studied at the Academy of Fine Arts in Vienna where he worked with Professor Sergius Pauser (1896–1970). In 1960 he joined the class of Albert Paris Gütersloh (1887–1973).

After leaving the academy he launched a career as a graphic artist and then as a freelance illustrator working for leading marketing agencies.

In 1962 Anger was commissioned to paint a portrait of Viennese soprano Leonie Rysanek.

In search of his own artistic expression he was influenced by different movements during the following years; his 1960s’ paintings reflected the spirit of the Vienna School of Fantastic Realism. From 1970 he created a range of panels and drawings in a kind of Austrian Pop Art, oriented on the works of Richard Lindner and Hans Bellmer; they were shown in an exhibition in Galleria Viotti in Turin, Italy in 1976.

From 1979 he gradually developed a new painting style he today considers to be “really his”, and managed the transition from graphic artist to full-time painter.

In 1986 Prof. Dr. Hans Bankl offered him an opportunity to create drawings within the Department of Pathology at his hospital.

From 1994 Anger made regular visits to Venice where he found motifs for a range of water colours and oils.

In 1987 Anger had his first solo exhibition at Galerie Zentrum in Vienna. It was followed by two further exhibitions, in 1989 and 1992. In 2000 his first solo exhibition at Galerie Tulbingerkogel, near Vienna, was staged, followed by a second in 2002. Anger's work has since been showcased at a number of venues in and around Vienna.

== Painting ==
Heinz Anger's paintings belong to representational (non-abstract) art. Anger main works are water colours and lithographies, predominantly representing landscapes, as well as oil paintings which include portraits, figurative art and still lifes in addition to landscapes.

Anger never intended to conform with what they call "modern"; he tries to rejuvenate by referring back to primordial nature.
His art is characterized by his use of light, his bold application of colours such as yellow, blue and violet, and his choice of often inconspicuous motives from nature.

Anger is an eminent painter of landscapes and water colours artist; in Austrian tradition, he often puts a simple motif into the centre of one of his watercolours: Inside a forest, a path covered with snow, wine cellars along an alley, hilly landscapes. He finds his inspiration in carefully chosen spots in and around Vienna, in the Vienna Woods and in nature parks.

Strong symbolism is found in several of his paintings [....]. In his oils paintings Angers repeatedly used motifs such as sunflowers, lilac and peonies at different stages, where nature is often enhanced and assumes symbolic character.

In his search for truth in nature the artist is approaching almost Waldmüller's ideals of imagery. However, in his impressionist symbolism he is close to van Gogh, Klimt and also Franz Wiegele.

(Regine Schmidt, Head of the Collection of the 20th Century at Österreichische Galerie Belvedere)
