= Karl Werner (theologian) =

Karl Werner (also referred to as Carl Werner; 8 March 1821, Hafnerbach – 4 April 1888, Vienna) was an Austrian theologian.

== Works ==
In the second half of nineteenth century, he published monographs related to the doctrines of the great doctors of the medieval and 16th century scholastic. The monographs addressed the thought of, among others, Roger Bacon, St. Bonaventure, St. Thomas Aquinas, Duns Scotus and Francisco Suarez.

His works include:

- 1850-1852 - System der christlichen Ethik, 3 vol., Regensburg (reedição: 1970, Ed. Minerva, Frankfurt am Main, ISBN 3-86598-400-2).
- 1859 - Der heilige Thomas von Aquino, Regensburg.
- 1861 - Franz Suarez und die Scholastik der letzten Jahrhunderts, 2 vol., Regensburg, 1861; 2. ed., 1889.
- 1861-1867 - Geschichte der apologetischen und polemischen Literatur der christlichen Theologie, 5 vol., Schaffhausen (reedição: 1966, Ed. Zeller, Osnbrück).
- 1866 - Geschichte der katholischen Theologie seit dem Trienter Concil bis zur Gegenwart, Munich
- 1873 - Die Psychologie des Wilhelm von Auvergne, Viena.
- 1876 - Alcuin und sein Jahrhundert, Paderborn.
- 1876 - Die Psychologie und Erkenntnislehre des Johannes Bonaventura, Viena.
- 1877 - Die Psychologie und Erkenntnislehre des Johannes Duns Scotus, Viena.
- 1877 - Die Sprachlogik des Johannes Duns Scotus, Viena.
- 1877 - Der Entwicklungsgang der mittelalterlichen Psychologie von Alcuin bis Albertus Magnus, Viena.
- 1879 - Giambattista Vico als Philosoph und gelehrter Forscher, Viena (ed. 1881).
- 1879 - Die Psychologie, Erkenntnis- und Wissenschaftslehre des Roger Bacon, Viena (reedição: 1966, Ed. Minerva, Frankfurt am Main, ISBN 3-86598-374-X)
- 1879 - Die Kosmologie und allgemeine Naturlehre des Roger Baco, Viena.
- 1881 - Johannes Duns Scotus, Viena.
- 1881-87 - Die Scholastik des späteren Mittelalters, 4 vol., Viena.

== Bibliography ==
- Pritz, Joseph: Mensch als Mitte. Leben und Werk Carl Werners. Vol. I., Herder, Viena 1968 (Wiener Beiträge zur Theologie, XXII/1)
- Emerich Coreth; Walter M. Neidl; Georg Pfligersdorffer (ed.), Filosofia cristiana en el pensamiento católico de los siglos XIX y XX, 3 volumes, Ediciones Encuentro, 1993. ISBN 84-7490-445-5

== See also ==
- Coimbra Commentaries
