= Ursprung =

Settlement in Austria

Ursprung is a settlement in the municipality of Dunkelsteinerwald in Melk District, Lower Austria in northeastern Austria.
