= Mauer bei Melk =

Village in Melk District, Austria

Mauer is a village in the municipality of Dunkelsteinerwald, in the Mostviertel in Lower Austria, Austria.

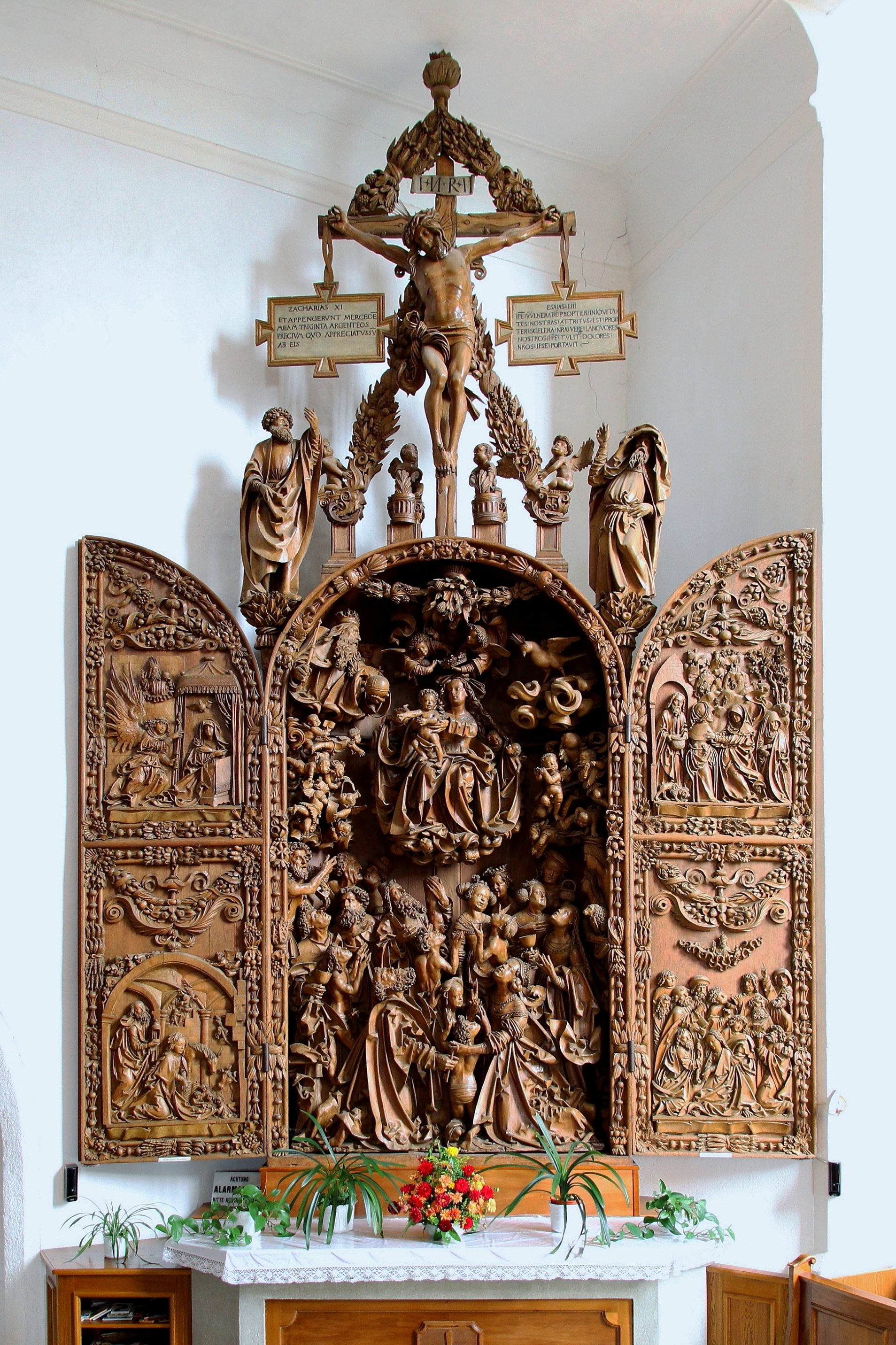
Mauer bei Melk, Carved altar of 1509

== History ==
The designations muri, ad mura, apud mura or the German designations Mour or Mower were mentioned as early as in the 11th and 12th centuries. In 1083, the village was mentioned, the church in 1096 for the first time in recorded history. The name indicates that medieval settlers encountered remnants of walls, probably from Roman times. The parish church of Mauer goes back into the earliest days of the settled history of the Dunkelsteinerwald. The powerful Counts of Formbach created it 1096. Around 1110, ownership was transferred to Göttweig Abbey.

== Economy and infrastructure ==
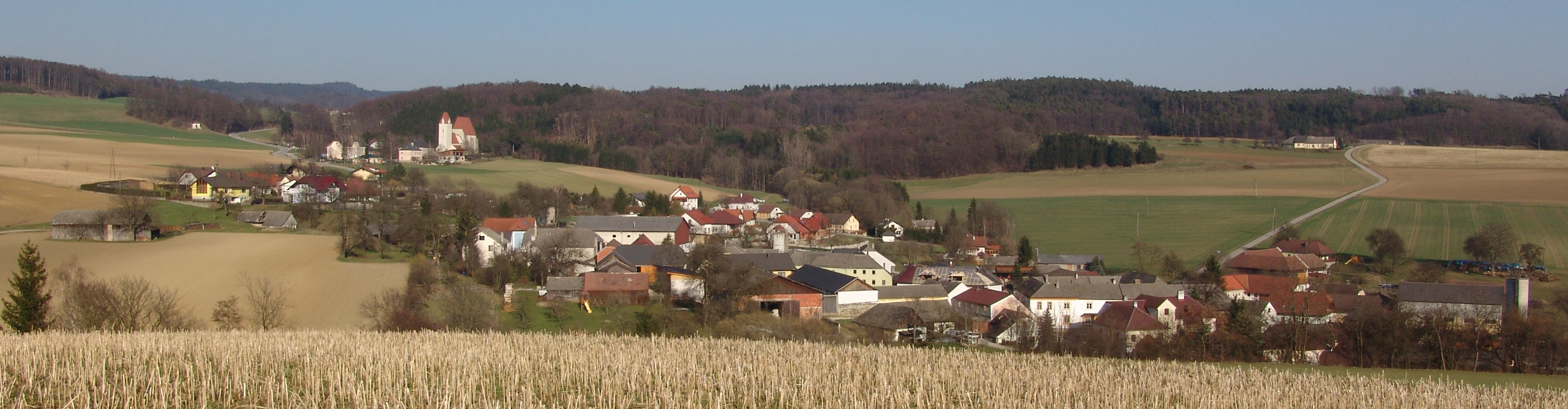
Mauer bei Melk

The place is a part of the market municipality Dunkelsteinerwald, which maintains a local building with a fire department, a municipal office and a registry office in the center. Some farms characterize the place. Since there are only one baker's shop and a few small individual enterprises, the lack of local infrastructure induces the municipality to orient itself strongly towards the neighbouring municipality of Loosdorf. The local centre was extended substantially only during the last few decades, with a core settlement of a single-family house forming its centerpiece. The significance of the village is strongly connected substantially to the importance of a carved altar, which is why the local church is particularly worth mentioning.

== Buildings ==
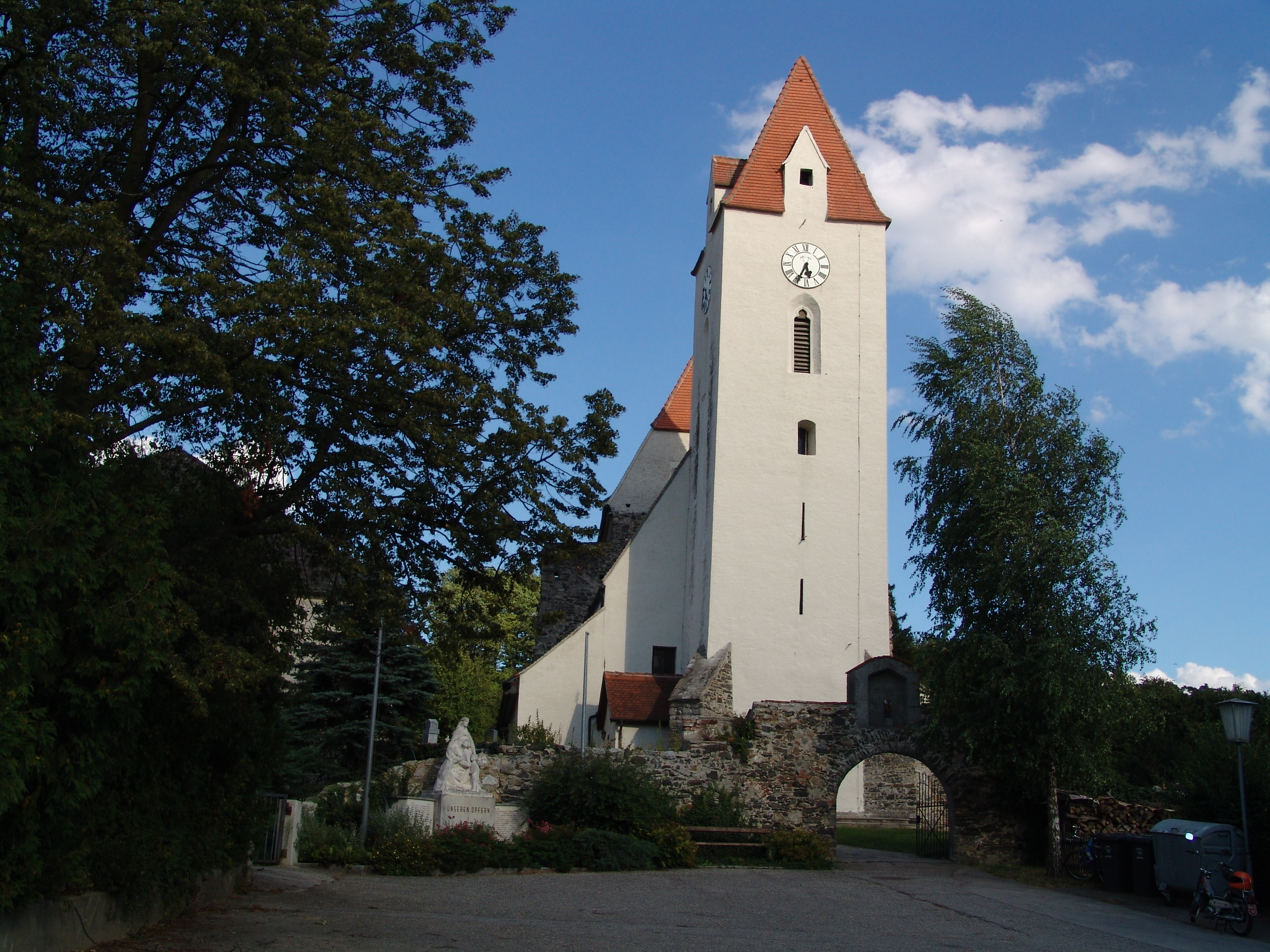
Church at Mauer bei Melk

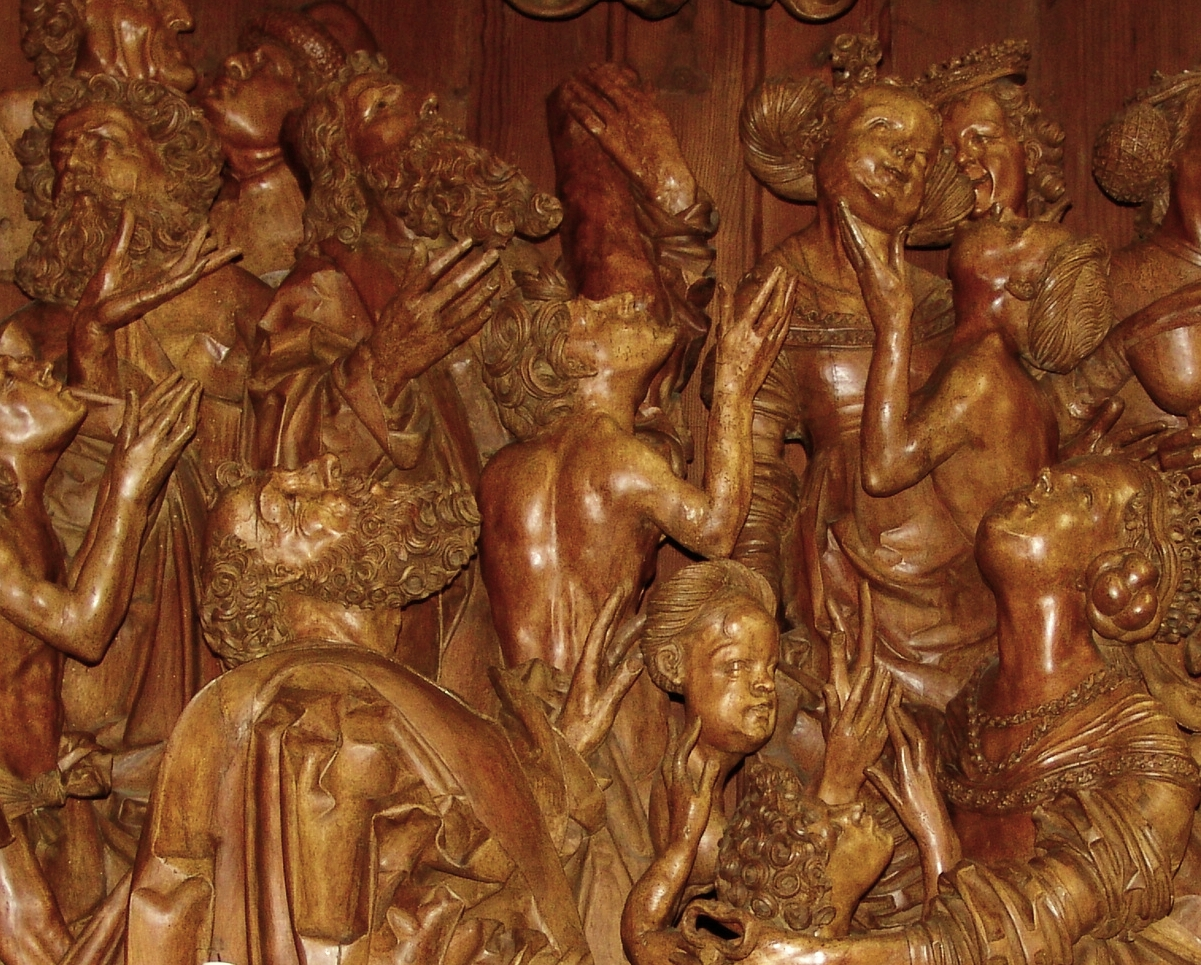
Detail from the carved altar

The pilgrimage church at Mauer bei Melk, which belongs to the Benedictine abbey of Göttweig was one of the oldest buildings of the area, but none of it has been preserved to this day. Possibly, the original church was a timber construction, as is reported in the Vita Altmanni. The possessions of Mauer parish, increased considerably in the 14th and 15th centuries.

The oldest part of the parish church probably dates back to this time. The two side ships were built in that time, while the high choir was built around 1300. The church was to be expanded during the 15th century, but the Reformation halted further building activity, because the Mr. von Albrechtsberg, who belonged to the promoters, had converted to the new doctrine. The gothic tower was built in the last phase. The old vestry was built at the same time as the choir, in extension of the northern side ship. In the baroque period, the equipment of the church was renewed.

Geographic coordinates: 48°13′47″N 15°25′21″E

== Roman bridge near Mauer ==
The Bridge dates back to the 3rd or 4th century.

Geographic coordinates: 48°14′06″N 15°26′29″E

== Bibliography ==
- Floßmann, Gerhard; Kirchenführer Wallfahrtskirche Mauer bei Melk, 1998
- Wirth, Theobald; Der Schnitzaltar von Mauer bei Melk, in: das münster. Heft 2, 152 - 157, 1997
- Der Schnitzaltar von Mauer bei Melk, 206. Sonderausstellung der österreichischen Galerie Belvedere in Wien, Wien 1997
- Michaela Maria Schuller, Der Altar von Mauer bei Melk - ursprüngliches Aussehen und ursprüngliche Ikonographie, Diplom-Arbeit, Universität Wien, 2003
- Feuchtmüller, Rupert: Der Schnitzaltar in Mauer bei Melk. Ein Wunder der Gotischen Schnitzkunst, Verlag Niederösterreich, Pressehaus, 1955
- Feuchtmüller, Rupert; Santol, Eugen: Der Schnitzaltar in Mauer bei Melk, St. Pölten, Wien, Niederösterreichisches Pressehaus, 1975
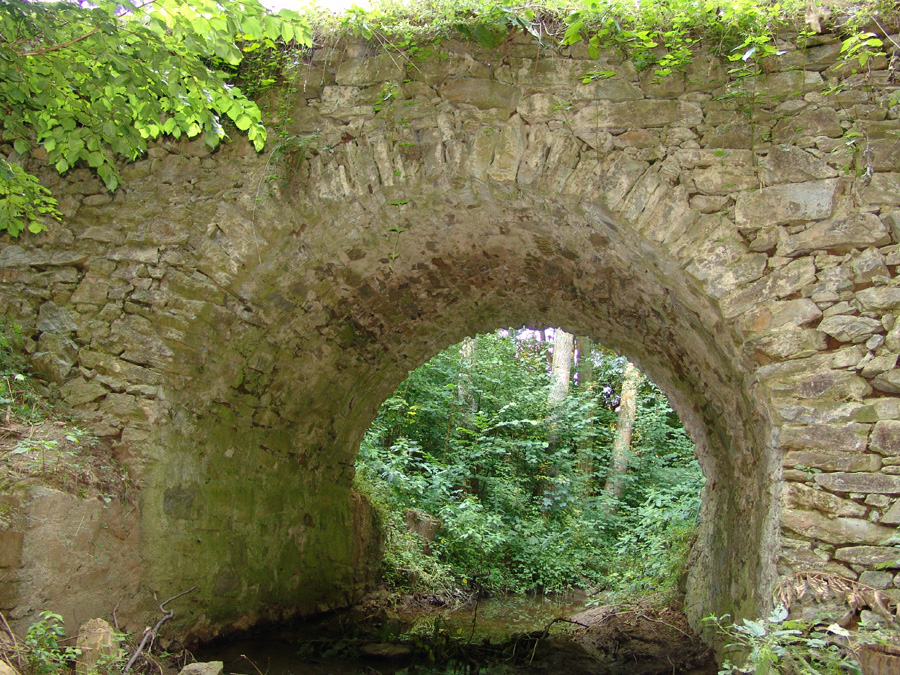
Roman bridge near Mauer

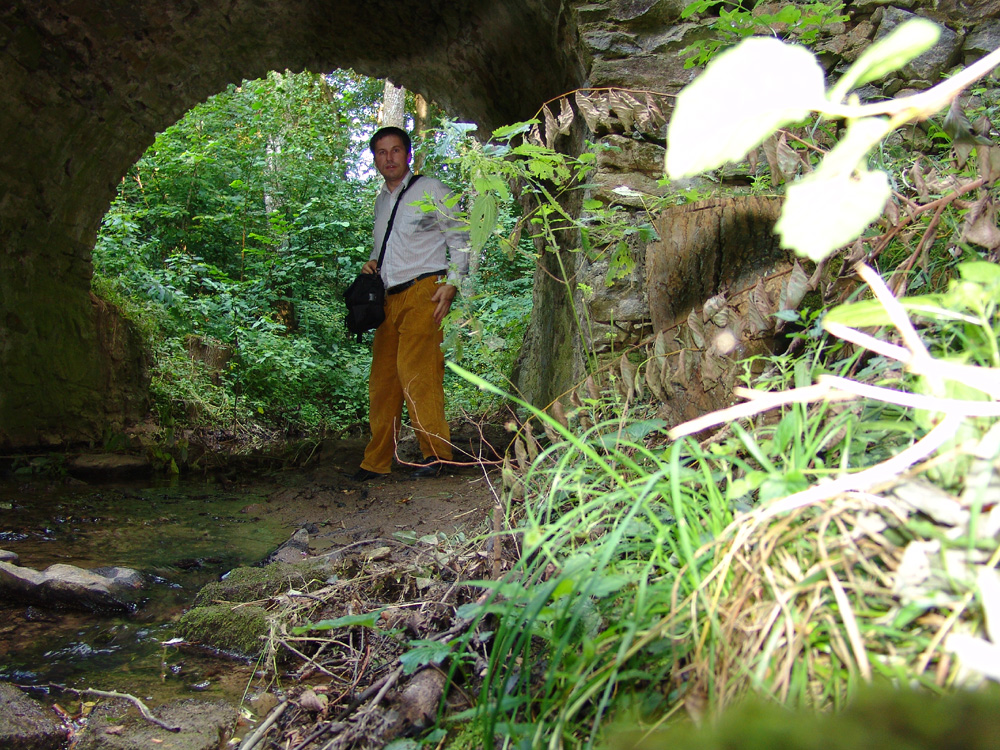

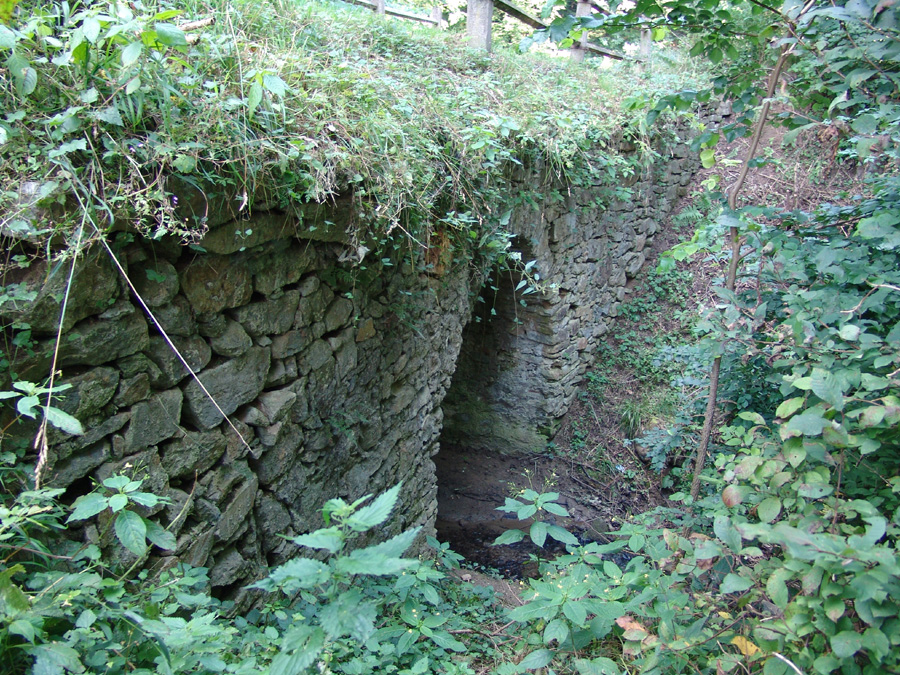

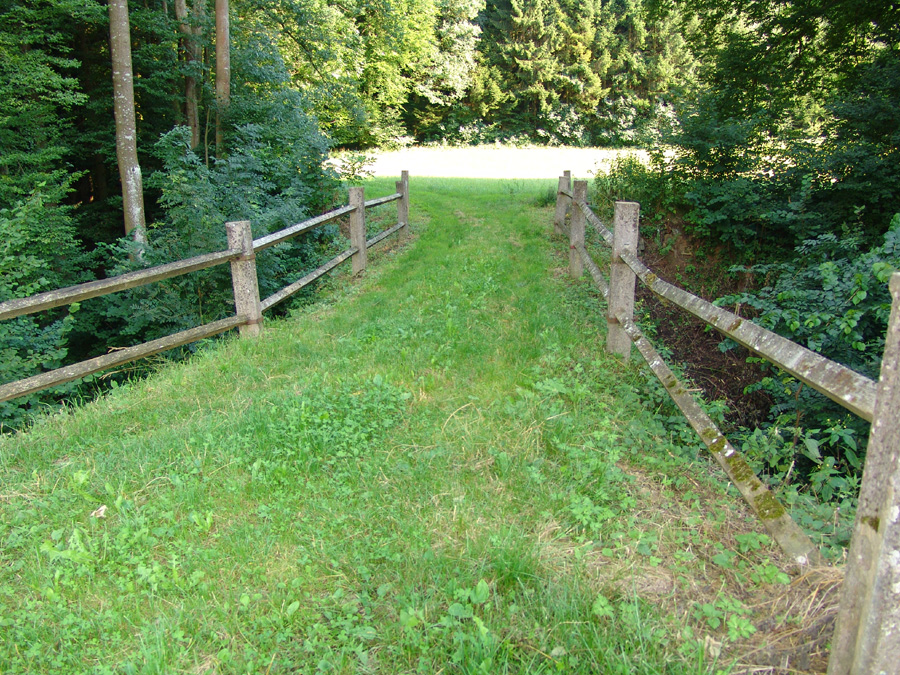
