= The Robber =

2010 film

- Film poster
- Directed by: Benjamin Heisenberg
- Written by: Benjamin Heisenberg; Martin Prinz
- Produced by: Nikolaus Geyrhalter; Peter Heilrath
- Starring: Andreas Lust
- Cinematography: Reinhold Vorschneider
- Edited by: Andrea Wagner
- Distributed by: Thimfilm (Austria); Zorro Film (Germany)
- Release dates: 15 February 2010 (Berlinale); 26 February 2010 (Austria); 4 March 2010 (Germany)
- Running time: 96 minutes
- Countries: Austria; Germany
- Language: German

The Robber (German: Der Räuber) is a 2010 drama film directed by Benjamin Heisenberg. The film is based on a novel by the Austrian author Martin Prinz, and was shot on location in Vienna. The main character, Johann Rettenberger, is based on Austrian bank-robber and runner Johann Kastenberger. The film was nominated for the Golden Bear at the 60th Berlin International Film Festival.

== Plot ==
Johann (Andreas Lust) is a convicted felon and marathon runner who has been paroled from prison for attempted armed robbery. Upon his release he immediately continues to commit bank robbery, armed with a shotgun and disguised with a mask. He then moves in with a young social worker and friend, Erika (Franziska Weisz), and the two soon begin a relationship. Johann goes on to win several marathons with record times, and is congratulated by his parole officer.

However, after committing several more robberies, Erika begins to suspect Johann. After finding Johann's loot under his bed she asks him to leave, but not before telling him that change is possible. After weeks of Johann failing to contact his parole officer, the officer shows up after a marathon to talk with Johann. The officer expresses concern that Johann is not keeping in contact and cooperating with him. After pressing Johann to talk with him, Johann becomes enraged and bludgeons his parole officer to death with his trophy.

After a final meeting with Erika, Johann is apprehended by the police in the hotel room where he had kept his money, having been turned in by a heartbroken Erika. After being handed a confession to sign, Johann breaks out of jail through a window and leads the police on a cross country manhunt on foot. He takes refuge in the house of an old man, and during the process of tying him up, the old man pulls a concealed pocket knife and stabs Johann deeply. Johann takes the old man’s car and drives until he notices a helicopter following him, after which he switches cars with some motorists at a rest stop, and seemingly evades the police. As Johann continues to drive he begins to lose consciousness, and realizes the seriousness of his wound. He pulls over, dying, and calls Erika, asking her to stay on the phone. Finally his breath slows, stops, and he dies.

== Cast ==
- Andreas Lust as Johann Rettenberger
- Johann Bednar
- Gerda Drabek as Bankangestellte
- Max Edelbacher
- Walter Huber as Beamter
- Markus Schleinzer
- Peter Vilnai
- Franziska Weisz as Erika
- Florian Wotruba as Markus Kreczi

== See also ==
- List of films about the sport of athletics
