= Gerolding =

Coordinates: 48°15′N 15°25′E

Gerolding is a settlement in the municipality of Dunkelsteinerwald in Melk District, Lower Austria in northeastern Austria.
