= Dunkelsteinerwald (municipality) =

- Municipality
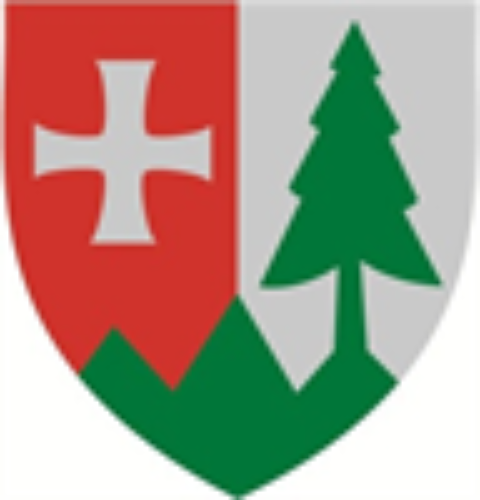
- Coat of arms

- Location within Austria
- Coordinates: 48°18′24″N 15°28′20″E
- Country: Austria
- State: Lower Austria
- District: Melk

Government
  - Mayor: Franz Penz (ÖVP)

Area
  - Total: 54.19 km^{2} (20.92 sq mi)
- Elevation: 585 m (1,919 ft)

Population (2018-01-01)
  - Total: 2,390
  - Density: 44.1/km^{2} (114/sq mi)
- Time zone: UTC+1 (CET)
  - Summer (DST): UTC+2 (CEST)
- Postal code: 3122
- Area code: 02753
- Vehicle registration: ME
- Website: www.dunkelsteinerwald.at

Dunkelsteinerwald is a market municipality with 2,289 inhabitants in the district Melk in Lower Austria, Austria.

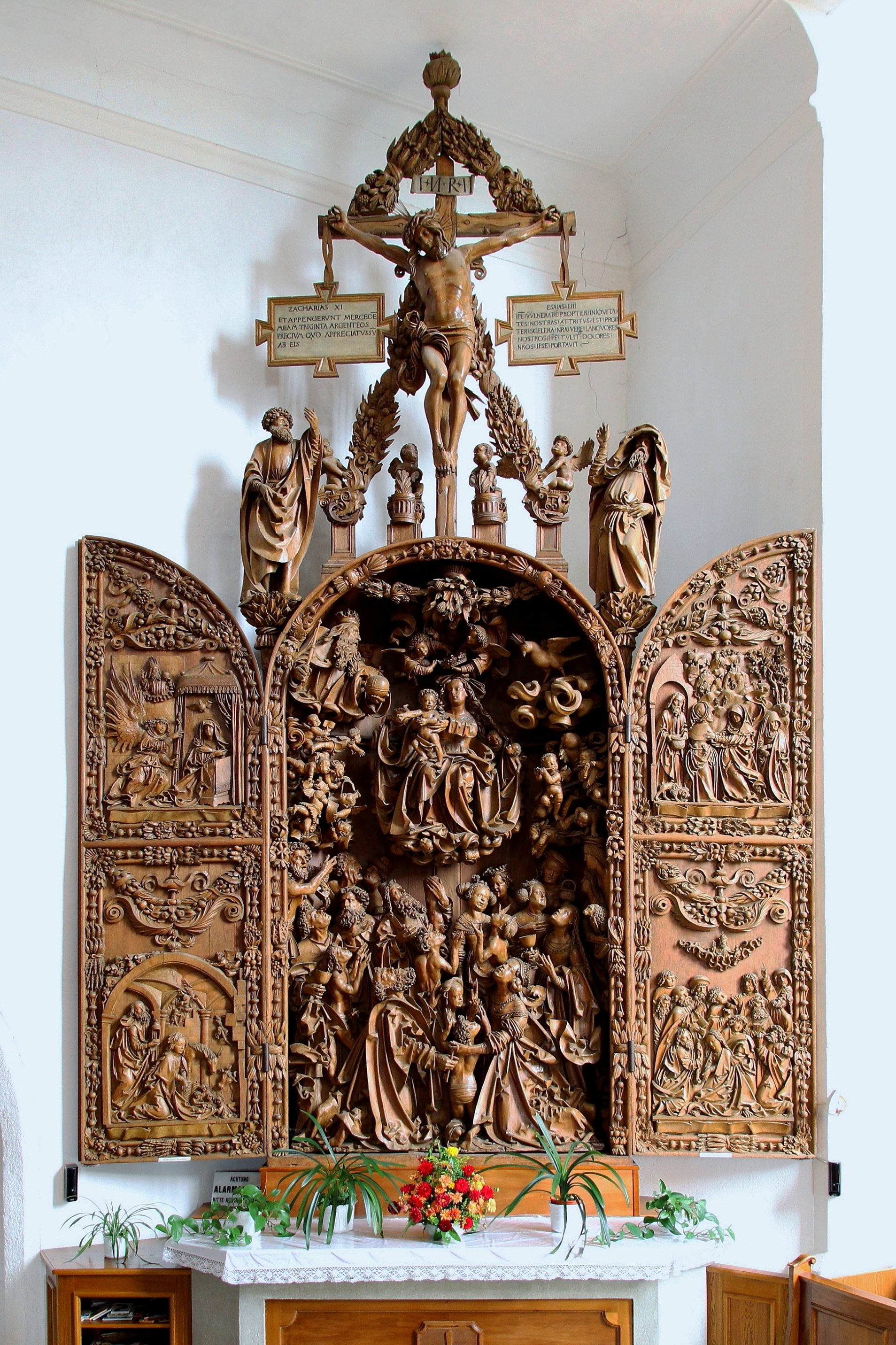
Mauer bei Melk, Carving altar 1509

== Geography ==
Dunkelsteinerwald lies in the Mostviertel in Lower Austria. The surface of the market municipality covers 54.19 square kilometers. 46.73 percent of the area is wooded.

The municipality includes the cadastral districts of Eckartsberg, Gansbach, Gerolding, Geroldinger Wald, Häusling, Heitzing, Hessendorf, Himberg, Hohenwarth, Kicking, Kochholz, Krapfenberg, Lanzing, Lerchfeld, Lottersberg, Mauer bei Melk, Neuhofen, Nölling, Ohnreith, Pfaffing, Thal, Umbach und Ursprung.

== History ==
In the antiquity the area was part of the Roman province of Noricum. Lying in the Austrian heartland of Lower Austria, the place took part in the eventful history of Austria.

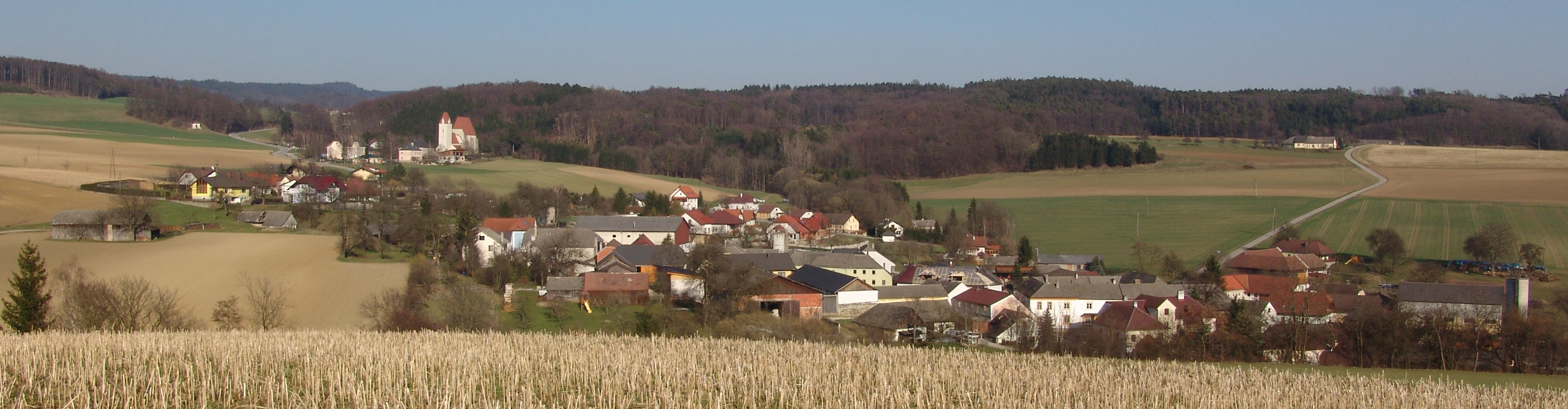
Mauer bei Melk

== Inhabitant development ==
After the result of the census of 2001, there were 2289 inhabitants. In 1991, the market municipality had 2025 inhabitants, up from 1941 in 1981 and 1911 in 1971.

== Politics ==
The mayor of the market municipality is Franz Penz from the christ-democratic ÖVP, the office manager Erich Galander. The 21 seats in the municipal council are currently assigned to the following parties: SPÖ 5, GREENs 1, ÖVP 15.

== Culture and sights ==
=== Buildings ===
- Roman bridge at Lanzing, which was probably built in the 3rd or 4th centuries.
- Mauer parish church at Mauer bei Melk, with its carved altar from 1509, a masterpiece of the late gothic. In the wings of the church, there are images showing the life of Lady Mary. Furthermore, the gothic Sakramenthäuschen is of artistic interest.
- Military church in Gerolding. The most interesting sights are the gothic pulpit, a fresco from the 17th century, and the gothic presbyterium with a "session niche".
- Parish church at Gansbach. The church probably originates from the 14th century. The side altar piece of the famous painter Kremser Schmidt and the high altarpiece, which was painted by one of his students, are worth seeing.
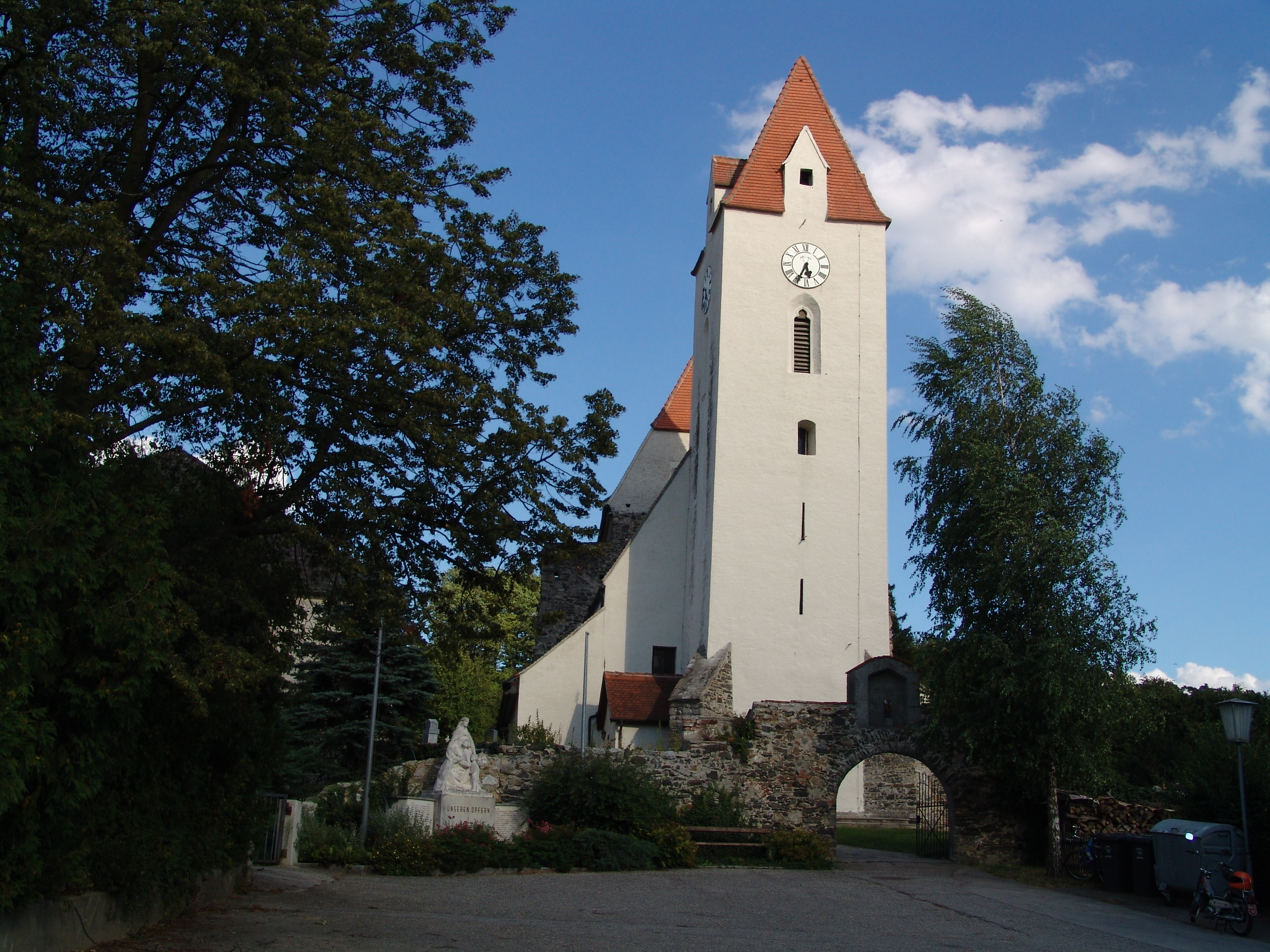
Church Mauer

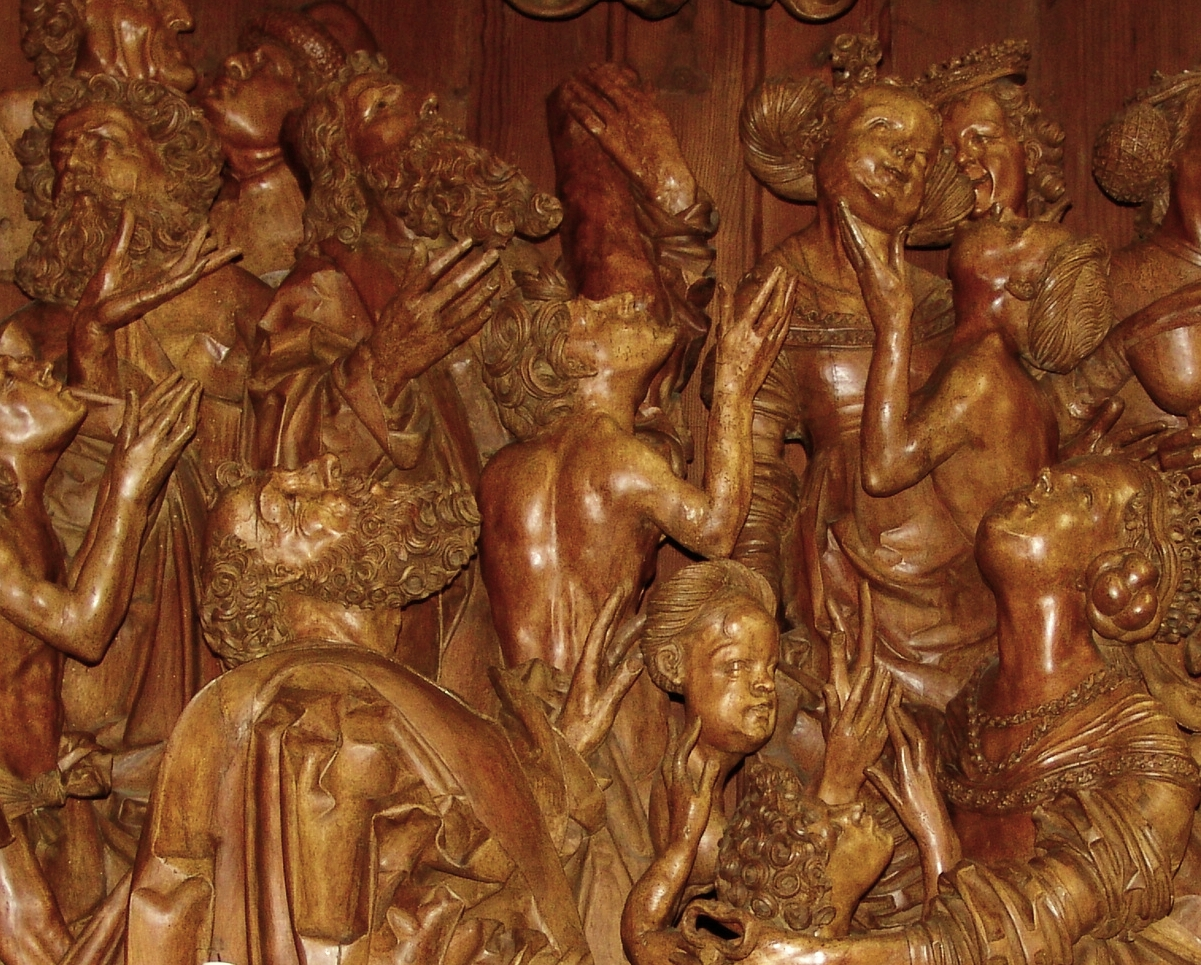
Carving altar

Sakramenthäuschen

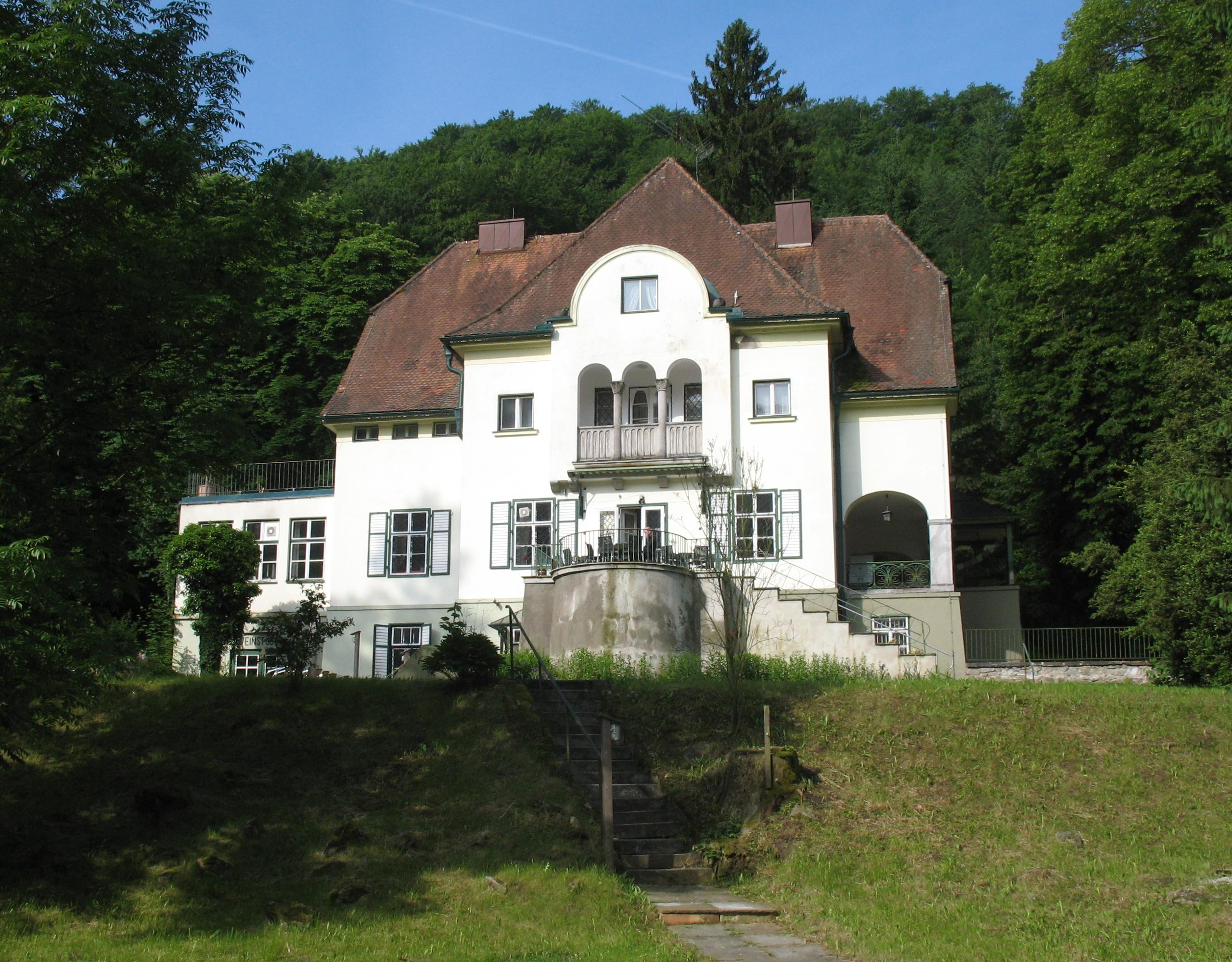
Jagdschloss Wolfstein in Kochholz
