= Burgruine Hohenegg =

- Dunkelsteinerwald, Lower Austria
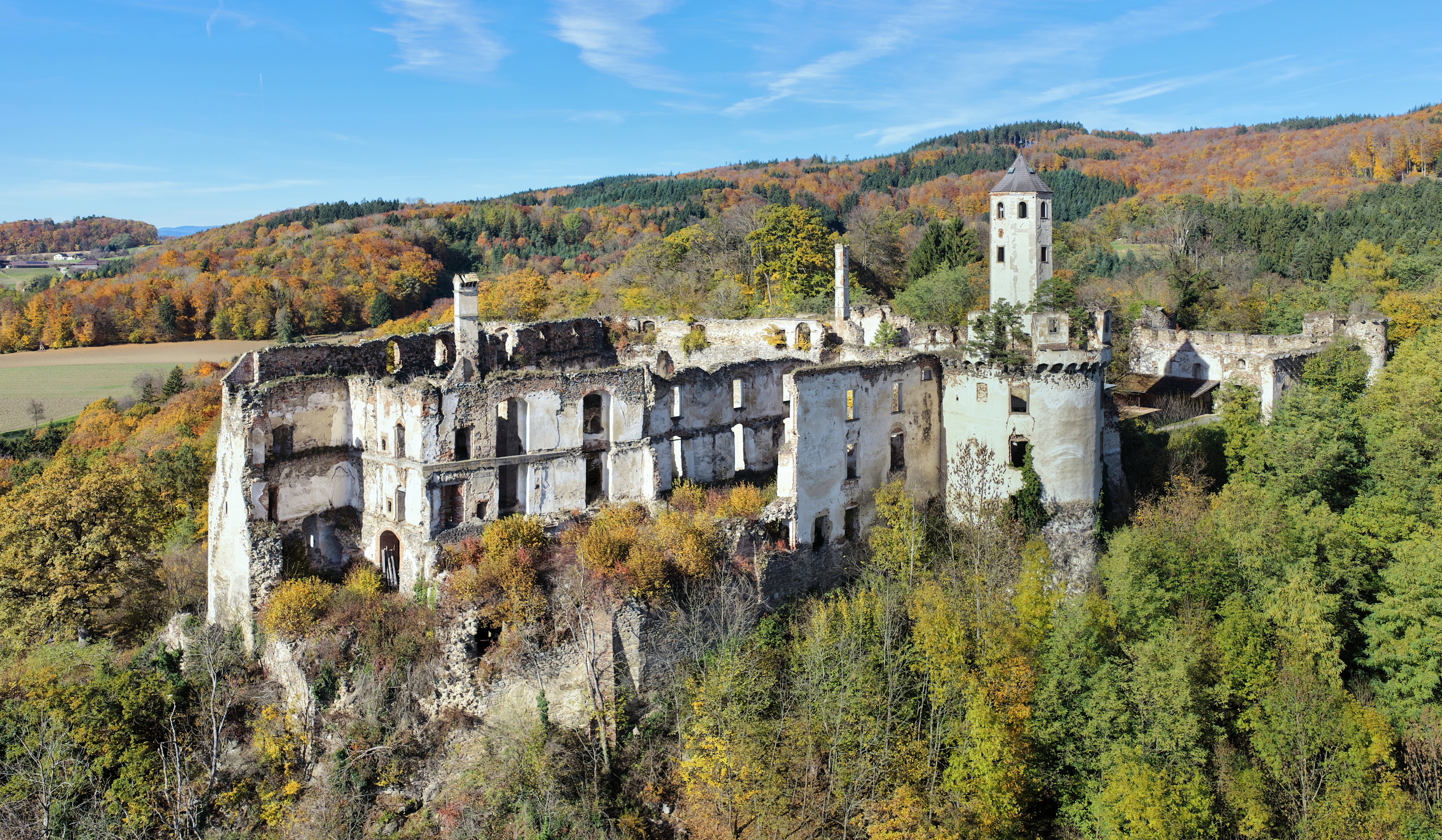

Location
- Coordinates: 48.233764°N 15.477042°E

Burgruine Hohenegg is a castle located in Dunkelsteinerwald, Lower Austria. Until the abolition of the manorial system in 1848, Hohenegg was the oldest and most important manor of the united Mitterau manor.

== History ==
The castle was first mentioned in a document in 1140. In 1173, the son of Hermann von Stein, Count Gebhart, named himself after the Hohenegg Castle. After 1188, the castle came into the possession of a branch of the Counts of Hohenburg, who brought it into their marriage with Diepold III, Margrave of Vohburg. Around 1210, the castle was given to Rudolf von Pottendorf as a sovereign fief. Around 1358, Reinprecht of Walsee acquired the castle from his brother-in-law Leutold von Pottendorf. The Lords of Walsee had major extensions made in 1463.

In 1464, Wolfgang V of Walsee sold Hohenegg Castle to Matthäus Spaur, who had made the extensions a year earlier. He was succeeded as lords of the castle by Sigmund in 1513 and Christoph, Baron von Spaur in 1534. In 1542, Christoph von Spaur sold the castle to Ludwig von Kirchberg. In 1571, his heirs inherited the castle. In 1579, Baron Albrecht von Enenkel, acquired the lordship and castle of Hohenegg from the Kirchberg heirs and had it converted into a Renaissance castle between 1584 and 1594. The castle passed to the Mamming family in 1606.

In 1624, the Lordship of Hohenegg came to the Montecuccoli family when Count Ernesto Montecuccoli was invested by Emperor Ferdinand II. The family still owns significant estates in the region to this day (e.g. Mitterau Castle). In 1631, Countess Barbara Montecuccoli resided at Hohenegg. Raimondo Montecuccoli later had Hohenegg expanded again and also built the outer bailey and the seven-story bell tower. Around 1740, Count Zeno Montecuccoli moved the seat of the manor from Hohenegg Castle to nearby Mitterau Castle for cost reasons. Hohenegg Castle was no longer the seat of the Montecuccoli family, but it was still part of their property. When the family moved, the Lordship of Hohenegg became part of the Lordship of Mitterau, as this had now become the new manor house.

During World War II, a resistance group from the Markersdorf air base used the lonely area to establish a secret meeting place and camp.

== See also ==
- Lords of Walsee
