= Gansbach =

Coordinates: 48°18′N 15°28′E

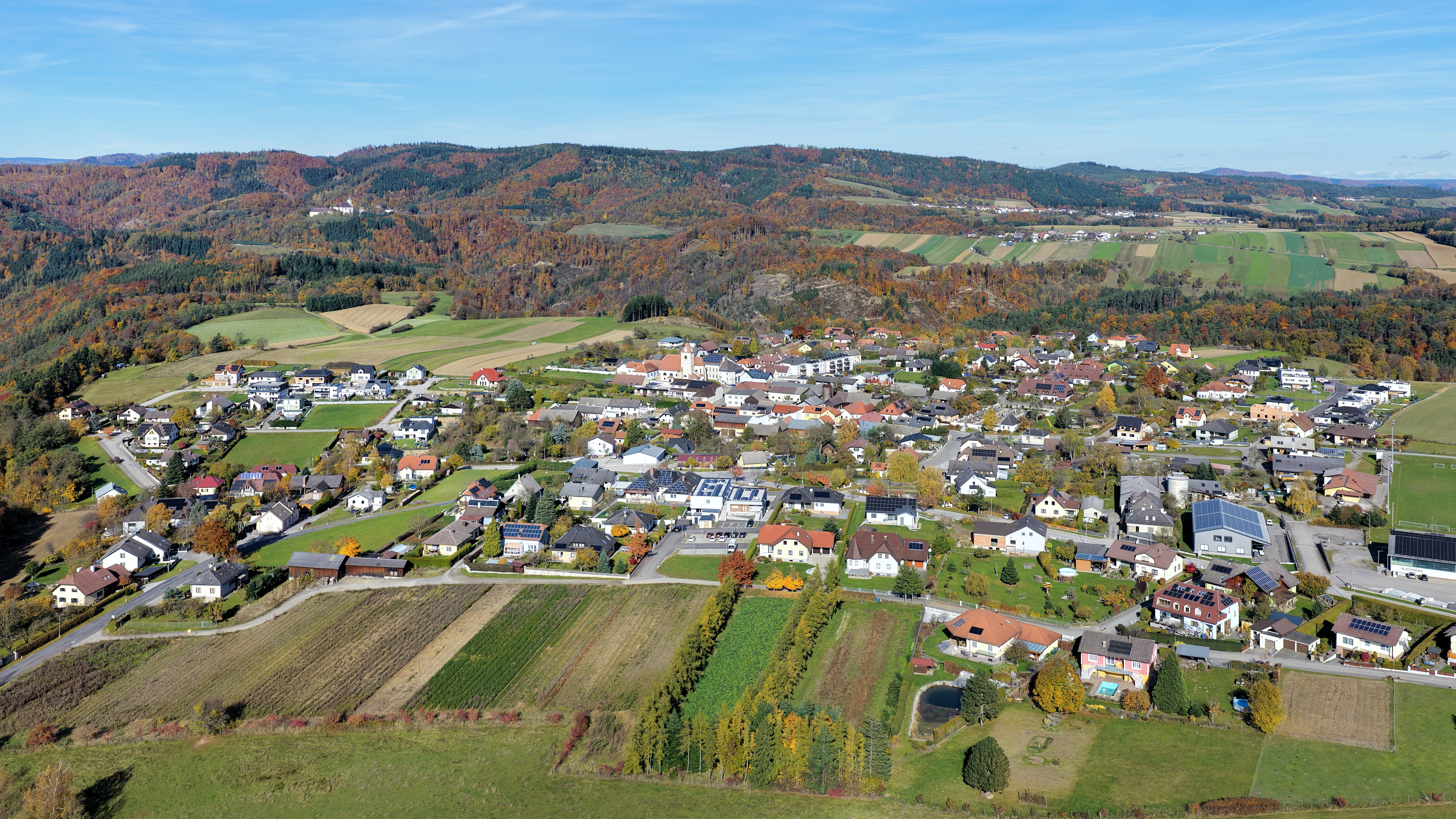
South-southeast view of Gansbach

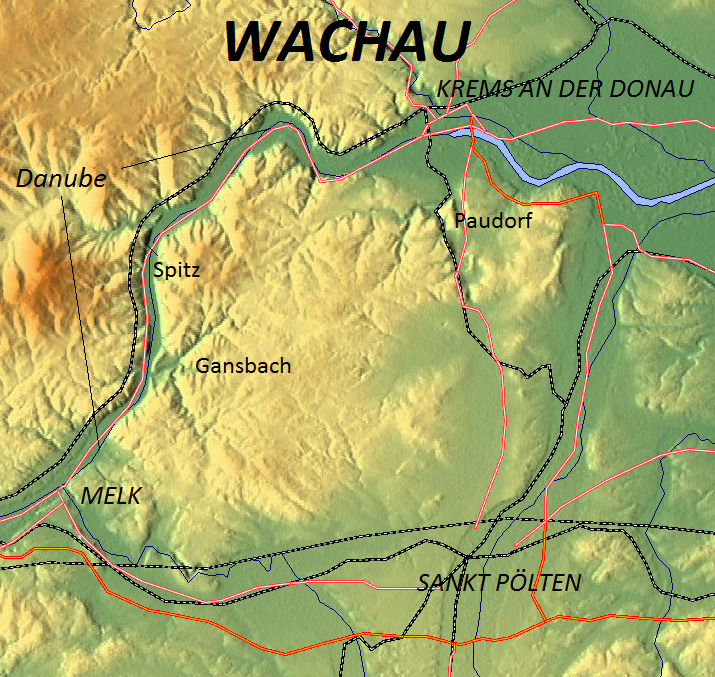
Map of the Wachau valley

Gansbach is a small town and centre of the municipality of Dunkelsteinerwald in Melk District, Lower Austria in northeastern Austria. It lies several kilometres inland from the Danube. To the west and north of the settlement is the Wachau valley. The parish church probably originates from the 14th century. The side altar piece of the famous painter Kremser Schmidt and the high altarpiece, which was painted by one of his students are of note.
