= Karlstetten =

- Municipality
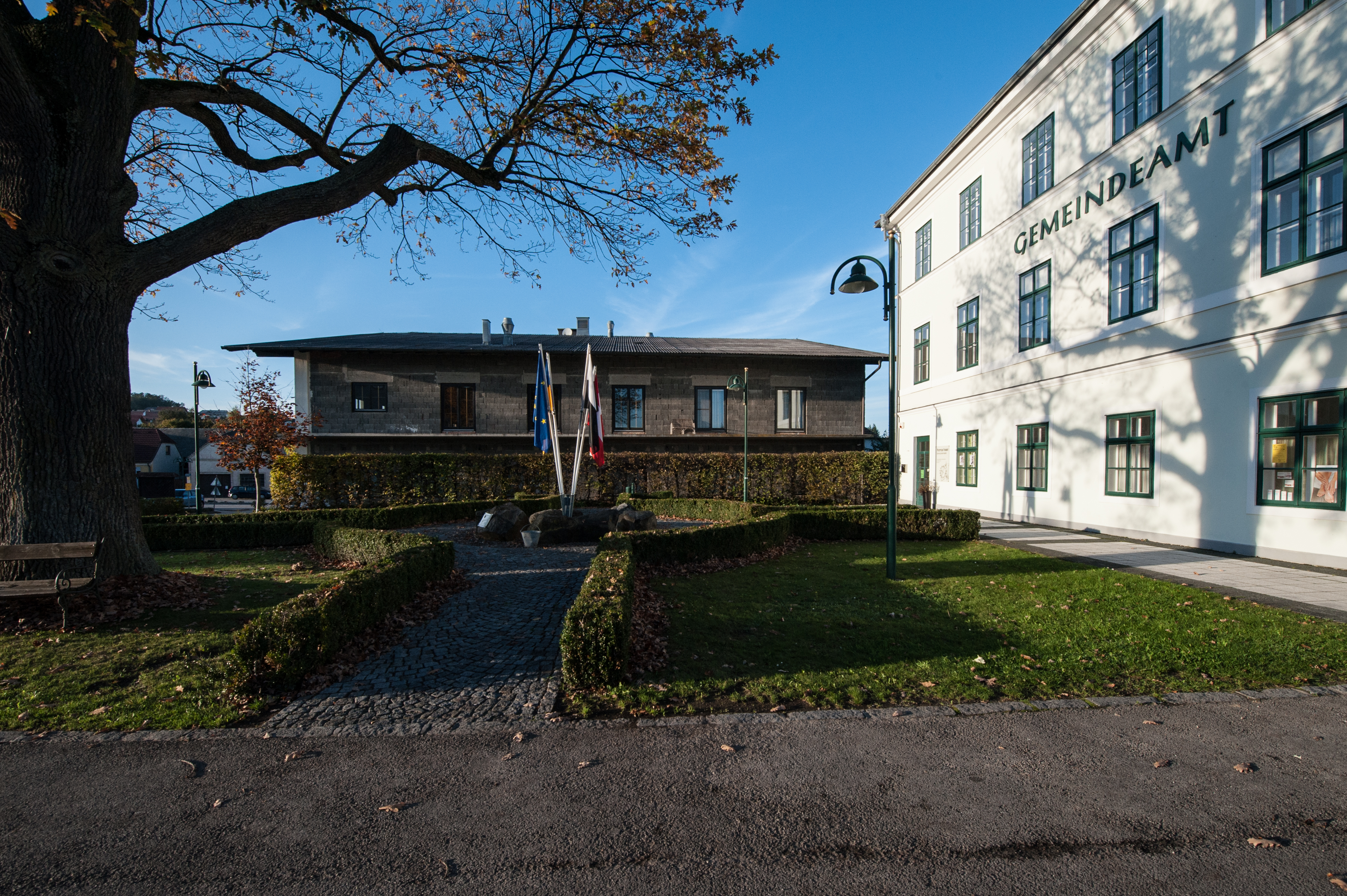
- Town hall in the castle

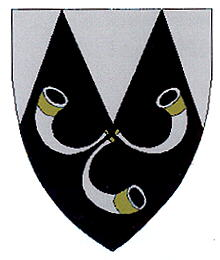
- Coat of arms

- Location within Austria
- Coordinates: 48°15′N 15°34′E
- Country: Austria
- State: Lower Austria
- District: Sankt Pölten-Land

Government
  - Mayor: Josef Neumeyr

Area
  - Total: 28.26 km^{2} (10.91 sq mi)
- Elevation: 375 m (1,230 ft)

Population (2018-01-01)
  - Total: 2,159
  - Density: 76.40/km^{2} (197.9/sq mi)
- Time zone: UTC+1 (CET)
  - Summer (DST): UTC+2 (CEST)
- Postal code: 3121
- Area code: 02741
- Website: http://www.karlstetten-dunkelsteinerwald.gv.at

Karlstetten is a community in the district of Sankt Pölten-Land in the Austrian state of Lower Austria. It has 2182 inhabitants.

== Geography ==
Karlstetten is located in the Mostviertel in Lower Austria at the south-east border of the Dunkelsteinerwald. Karlstetten has an overall area of 28,21 km^{2}, 43,15 percent of this area is forested.

Cadastral communities are: Karlstetten, Heitzing, Hausenbach, Weyersdorf, Lauterbach, Obermamau, Untermamau, Schaubing. Further villages are Dreihöf, Rosenthal, Wieshöf, Eglsee.

== History ==
In ancient geography, Karlstetten was part of the province Noricum. On 9 September 1083, the village was first mentioned in the "Göttweiger Stiftungsurkunde". From 1459 to 1831, the family von Zinzendorf had been the ruler of the village. Their successors were Count Baudissin and Baron Candid von Suttner. In 1925 the manor was bought by Zacharias Frank, a German industrial. In 1945 it was seized by the Russian occupants as "German property". 1965 it was given into the hands of the community.

=== Population ===
Historical population
Year	Pop.	±%
1971	1,578	—
1981	1,723	+9.2%
1991	1,787	+3.7%
2001	1,999	+11.9%

== Politics ==
Mayor of the community is Anton Fischer, his substitute is Josef Hofbauer. In the council the seats are distributed as follows: ÖVP 10, SPÖ8, FPÖ 1. (March 2005)

== Sports ==
The soccer team "SV Karlstetten/Neidling" plays in the "Gebietsliga West".

== Economy and infrastructure ==
In 2001 there were 73 workplaces which were not agricultural. There were 75 agricultural ones. 974 people are employed in the village.

Karlstetten has the following institutions: kindergarten, elementary school, secondary modern school, general practitioner, dentist, musical school, musical society, gymnastics club.

=== Volunteer fire brigade ===
The market town Karlstetten has 3 volunteer fire brigades available: FF Karlstetten, FF Weyersdorf and FF Hausenbach. There is also a fire brigade youth group in Karlstetten.
