= Bergland, Austria =

Bergland
- Municipality
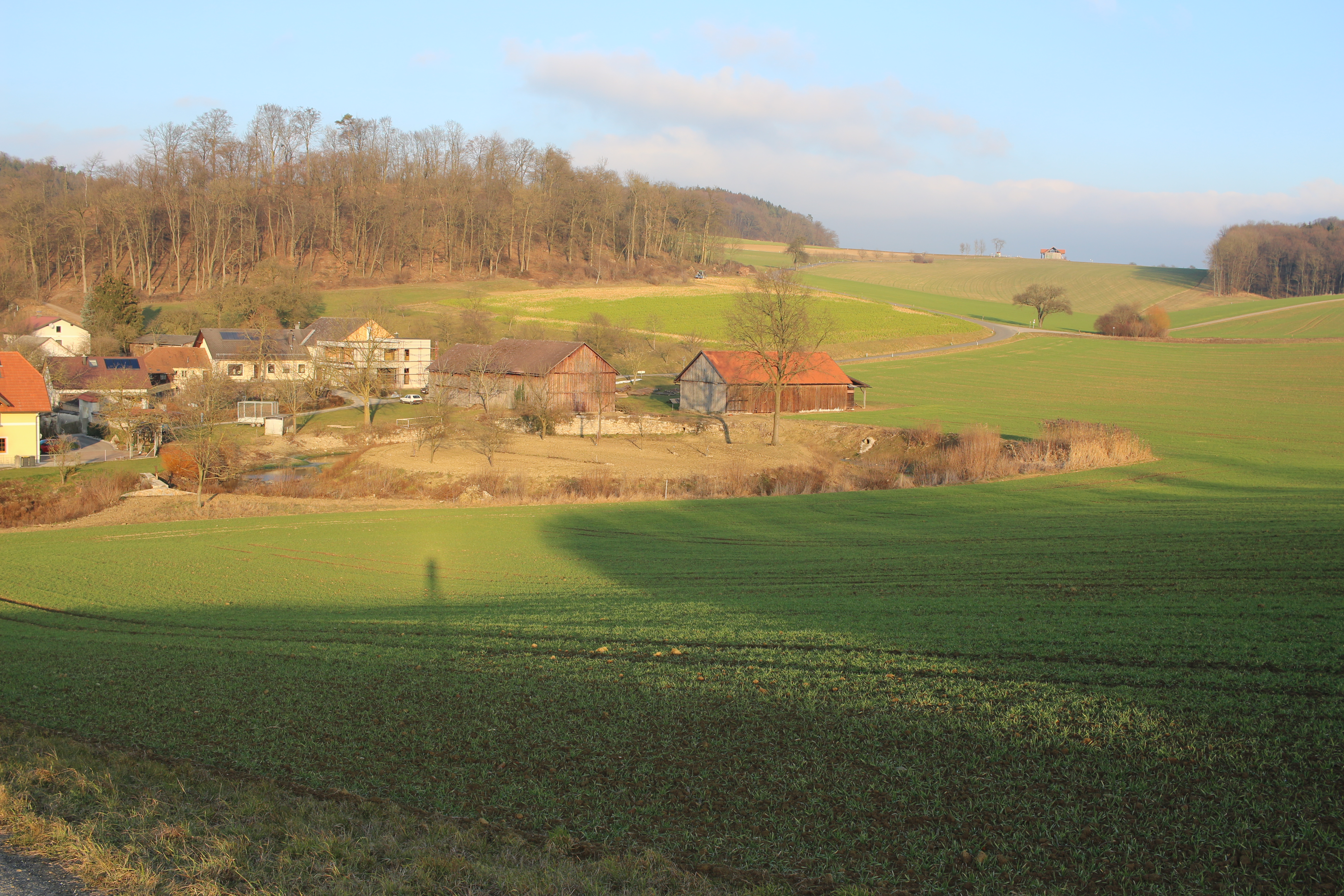
- Area of the former Wasserburg fortress in Bergland

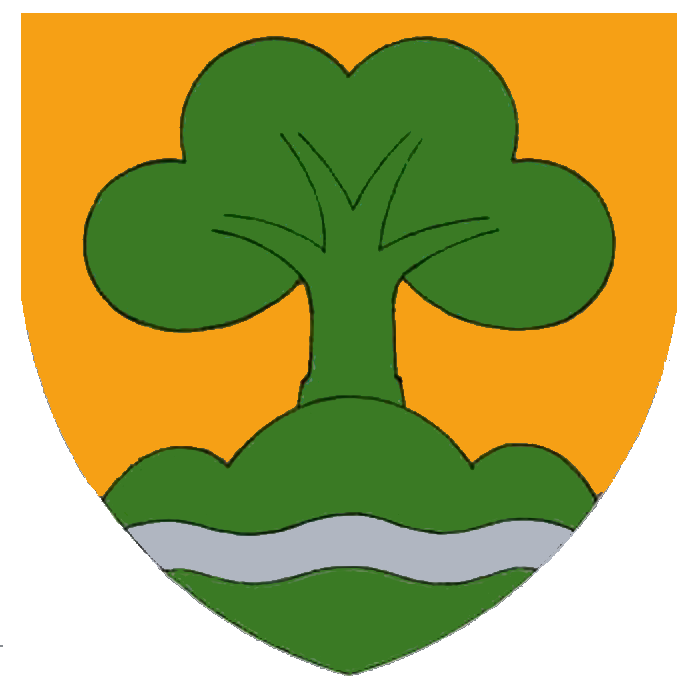
- Coat of arms

- Location within Austria
- Coordinates: 48°9′N 15°11′E
- Country: Austria
- State: Lower Austria
- District: Melk

Government
  - Mayor: Franz Wieser

Area
  - Total: 33.89 km^{2} (13.09 sq mi)
- Elevation: 252 m (827 ft)

Population (2018-01-01)
  - Total: 1,909
  - Density: 56.33/km^{2} (145.9/sq mi)
- Time zone: UTC+1 (CET)
  - Summer (DST): UTC+2 (CEST)
- Postal code: 3254
- Area code: 07416
- Website: www.bergland.gv.at

Bergland is a municipality in the district of Melk in the Austrian state of Lower Austria.

== Population ==
Historical population
Year	Pop.	±%
1971	1,511	—
1981	1,528	+1.1%
1991	1,614	+5.6%
2001	1,747	+8.2%
2011	1,846	+5.7%
2021	1,916	+3.8%
