= Haunoldstein =

Town in Lower Austria, Austria

- Municipality
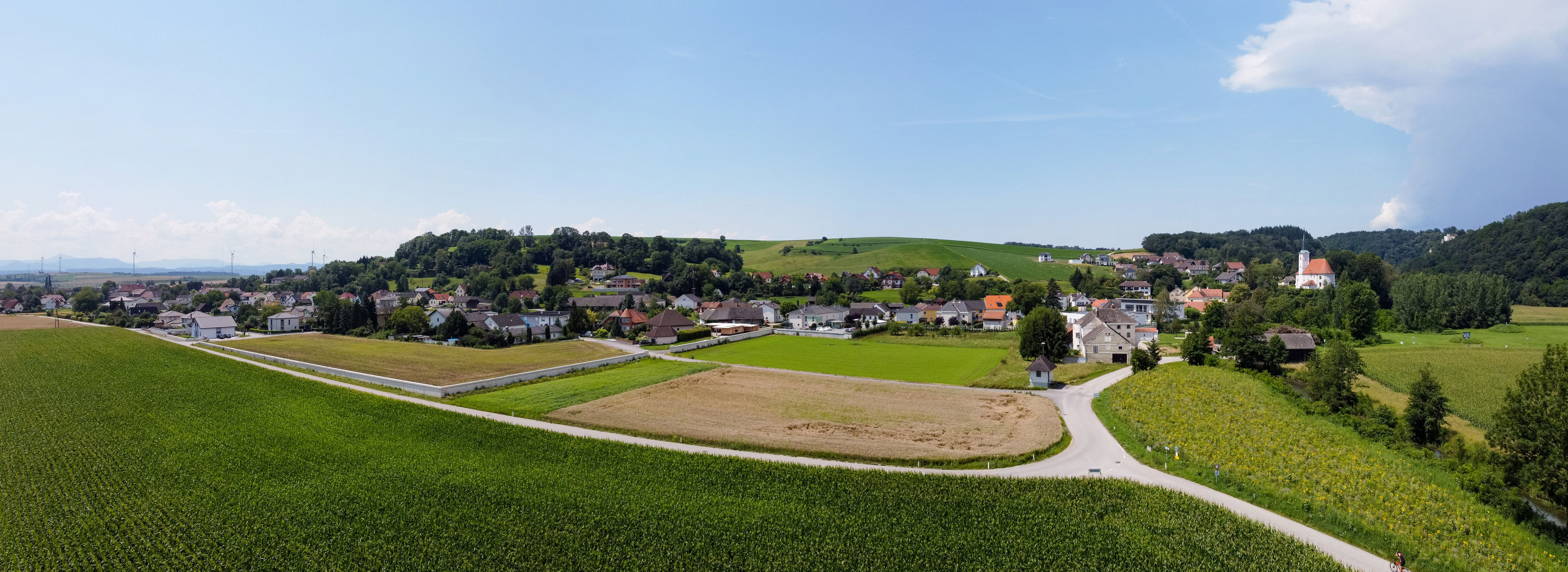

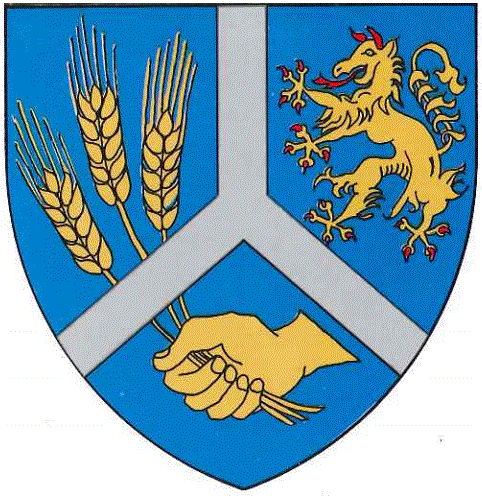
- Coat of arms

- Location within Austria
- Coordinates: 48°12′N 15°27′E
- Country: Austria
- State: Lower Austria
- District: Sankt Pölten-Land

Government
  - Mayor: Hubert Luger

Area
  - Total: 9.89 km^{2} (3.82 sq mi)
- Elevation: 250 m (820 ft)

Population (2018-01-01)
  - Total: 1,160
  - Density: 117/km^{2} (304/sq mi)
- Time zone: UTC+1 (CET)
  - Summer (DST): UTC+2 (CEST)
- Postal code: 3384
- Area code: 02749
- Website: www.haunoldstein.gv.at

Haunoldstein is a town in the district of Sankt Pölten-Land in the Austrian state of Lower Austria.

== Population ==
Historical population
Year	Pop.	±%
1971	700	—
1981	789	+12.7%
1991	852	+8.0%
2001	940	+10.3%
