= Hafnerbach =

- Municipality
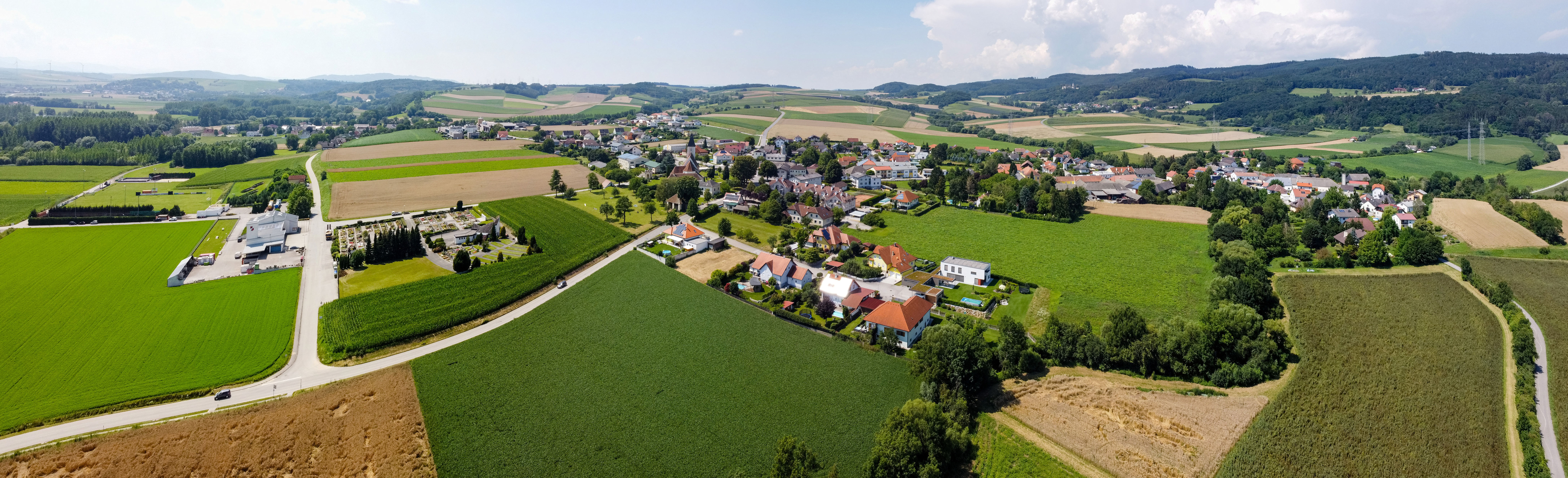

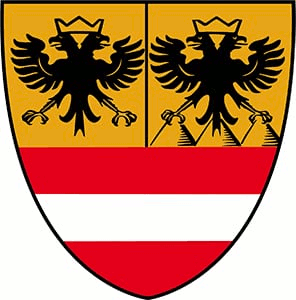
- Coat of arms

- Location within Austria
- Coordinates: 48°13′N 15°29′E
- Country: Austria
- State: Lower Austria
- District: Sankt Pölten-Land

Government
  - Mayor: Stefan Gratzl (ÖVP)

Area
  - Total: 29.23 km^{2} (11.29 sq mi)
- Elevation: 266 m (873 ft)

Population (2018-01-01)
  - Total: 1,672
  - Density: 57.20/km^{2} (148.2/sq mi)
- Time zone: UTC+1 (CET)
  - Summer (DST): UTC+2 (CEST)
- Postal code: 3386
- Area code: 02749
- Website: www.hafnerbach.gv.at

Hafnerbach is a town in the district of Sankt Pölten-Land in the Austrian state of Lower Austria.

== Population ==
Historical population
Year	Pop.	±%
1971	1,414	—
1981	1,399	−1.1%
1991	1,537	+9.9%
2001	1,647	+7.2%
