= Melk District =

Coordinates: 48.200°N 15.204°E

Melk District Bezirk Melk
- District
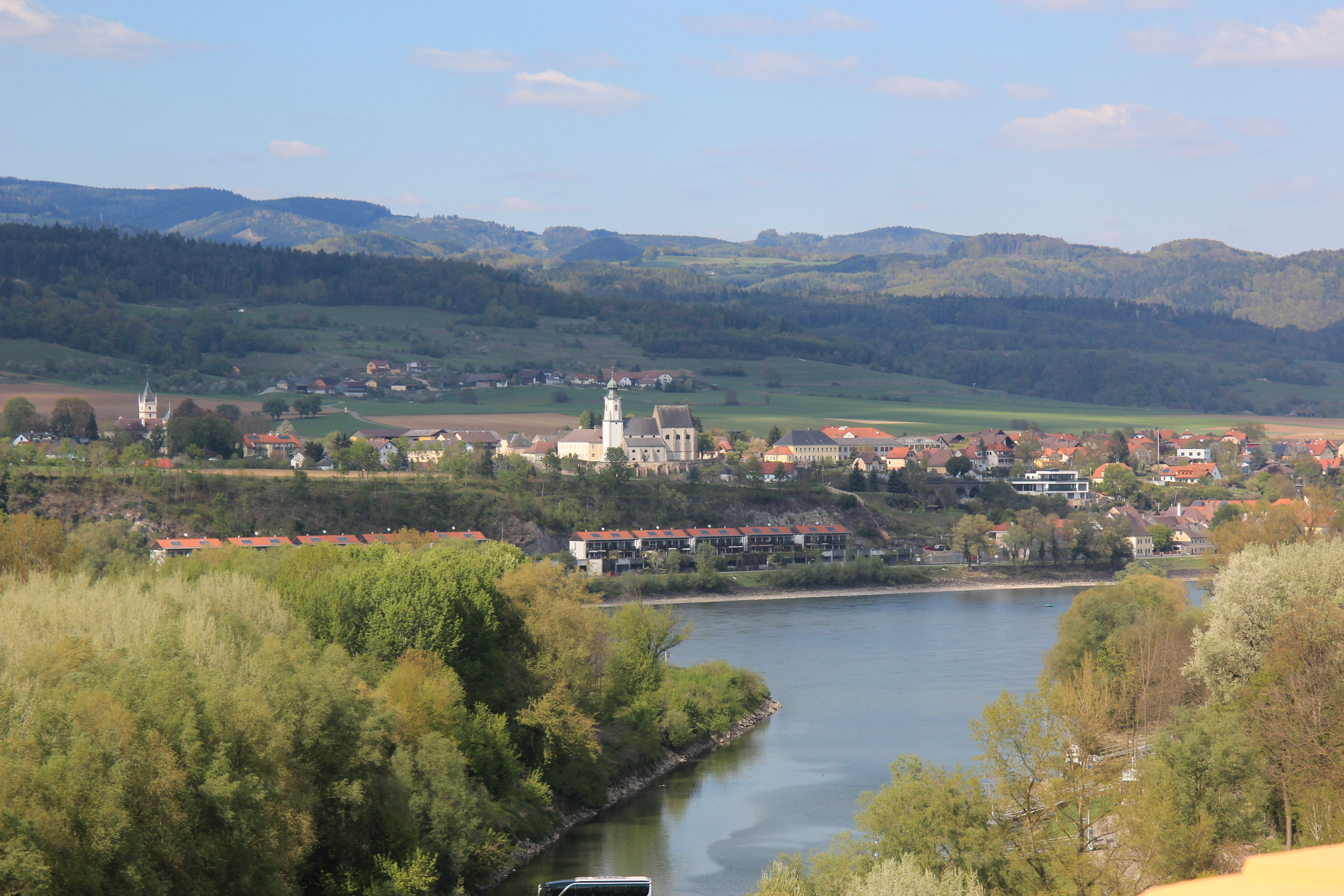
- Melk district
- Country: Austria
- State: Lower Austria
- Number of municipalities: 40
- Administrative seat: Melk

Government
  - District Governor: Daniela Obleser

Area
  - Total: 1,013.6 km^{2} (391.4 sq mi)

Population (2024)
  - Total: 79,176
  - Density: 78.114/km^{2} (202.31/sq mi)
- Time zone: UTC+01:00 (CET)
  - Summer (DST): UTC+02:00 (CEST)
- Vehicle registration: ME
- NUTS code: AT121, AT124
- District code: 315

Bezirk Melk (Central Bavarian: Beziak Möck) is a district of the Austrian state of Lower Austria.
