= Wachau =

Valley in Austria

Wachau Cultural Landscape
UNESCO World Heritage Site
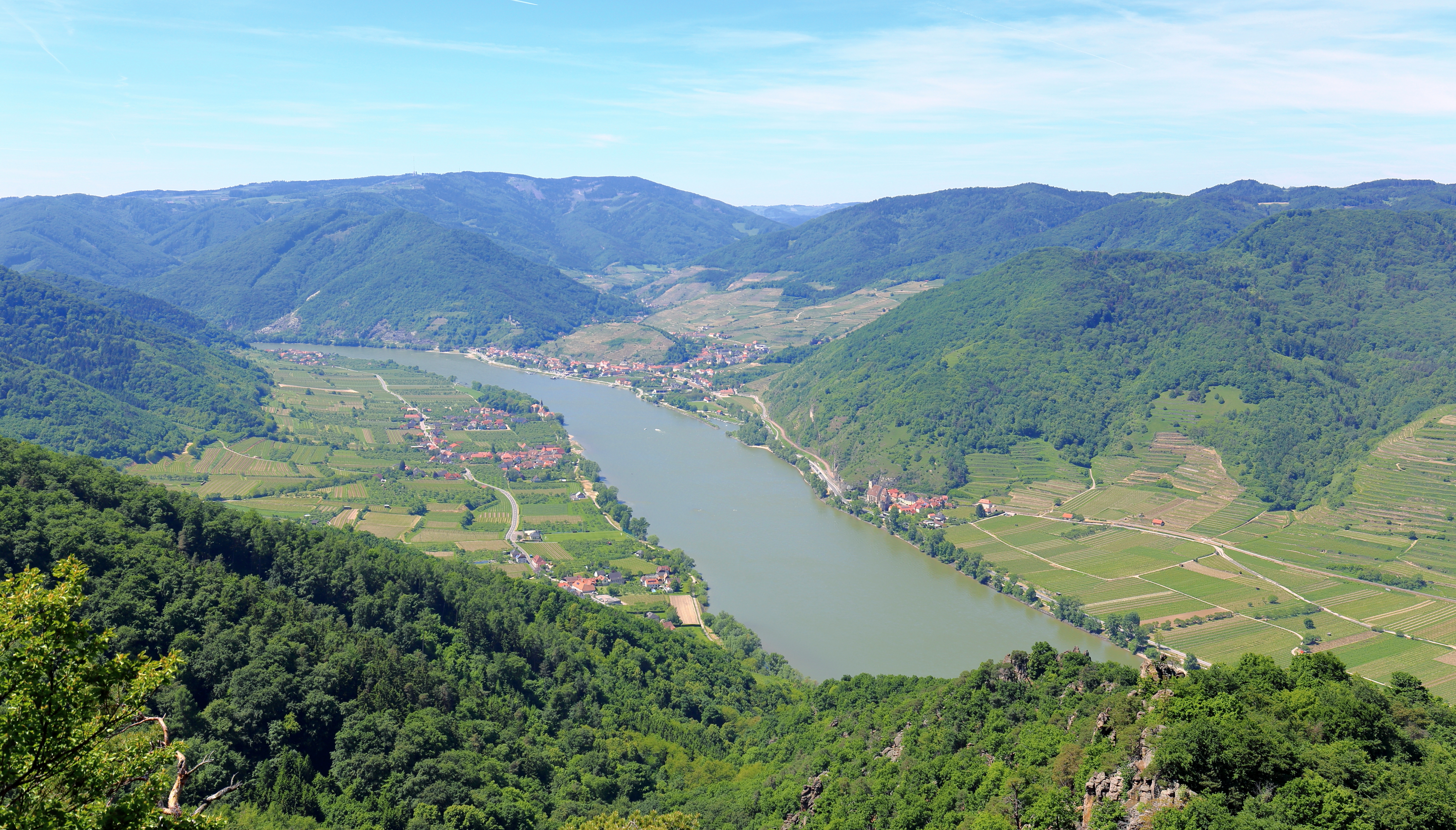

- Location within Austria Location within Lower Austria
- Location: Lower Austria, Austria
- Criteria: Cultural: (ii)(iv)
- Reference: 970
- Inscription: 2000 (24th Session)
- Area: 18,387 ha (45,440 acres)
- Buffer zone: 2,942 ha (7,270 acres)
- Website: www.wachau.at
- Coordinates: 48°21′52″N 15°26′3″E

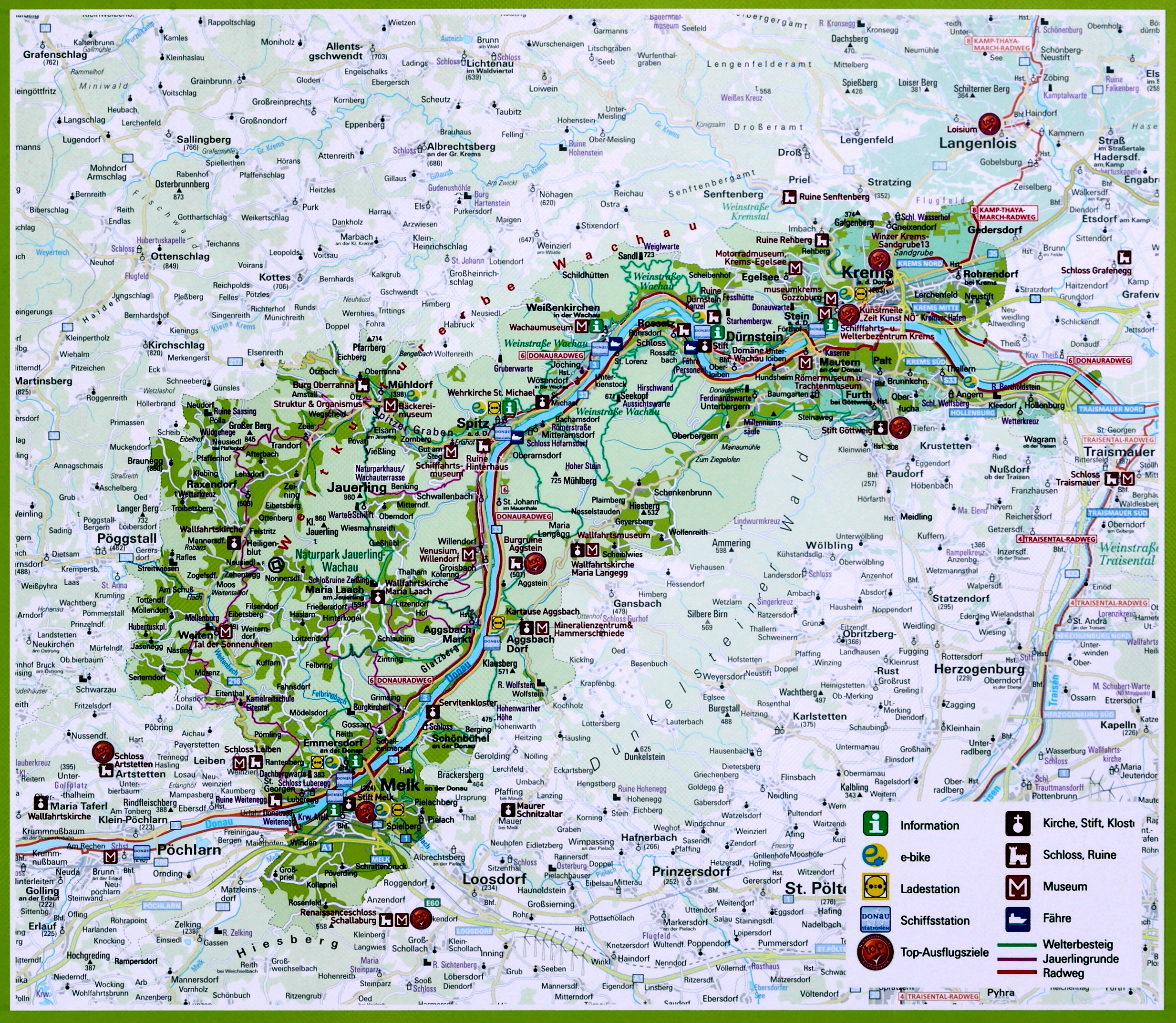
Map of Wachau Cultural Landscape

Wachau (2008)
Wachau seen from Danube river (2008)

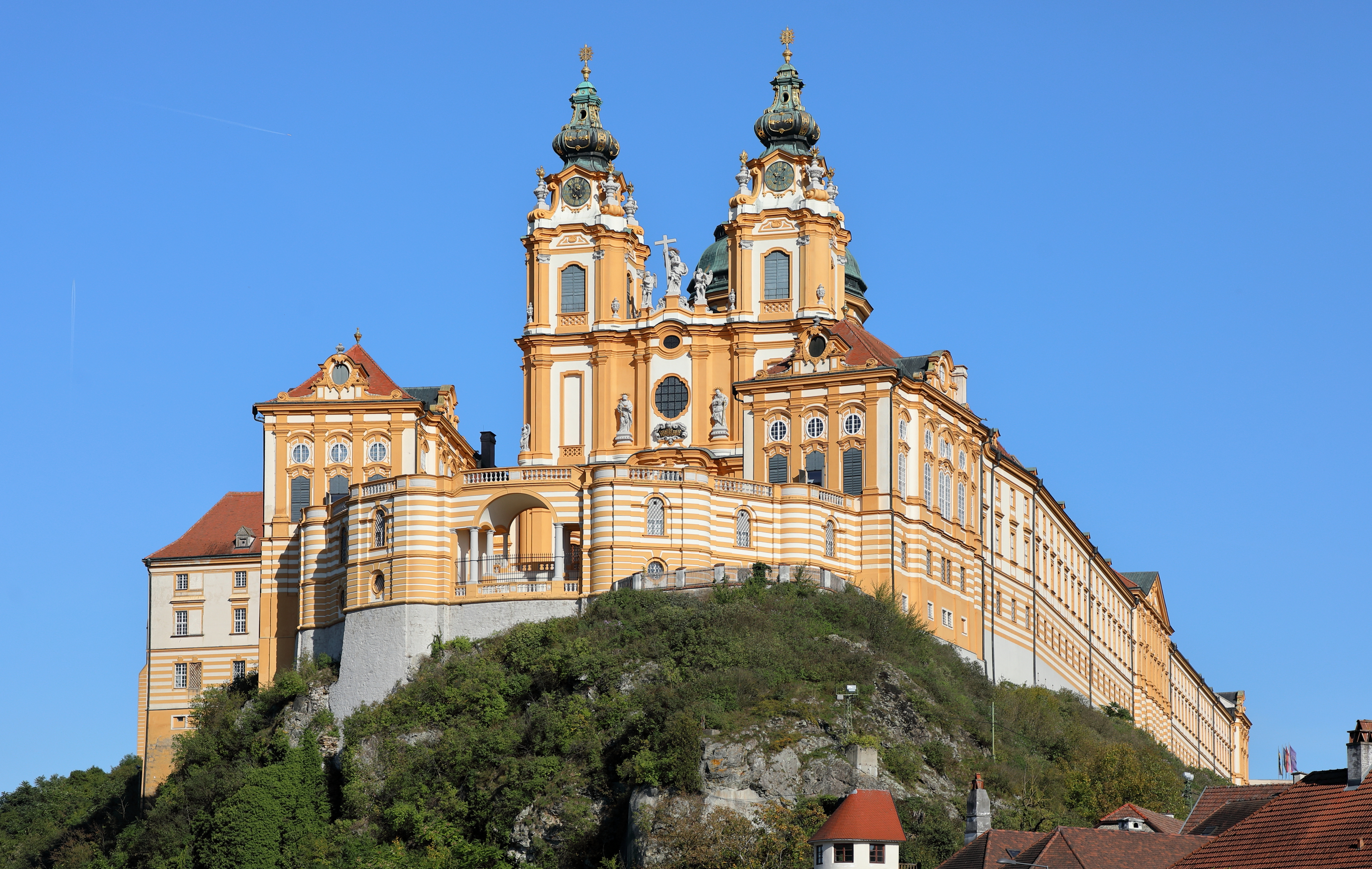
Melk Abbey

The Wachau (German pronunciation: [vaˈxaʊ̯]) is an Austrian valley formed by the Danube River. It is one of the most prominent tourist destinations of Lower Austria, located between the towns of Melk and Krems that attracts epicureans for its high-quality wines. It is 36 kilometres (22 mi) in length and has been settled since prehistoric times. Among the tourist attractions is Dürnstein Castle, where King Richard I of England was held captive by Leopold V, Duke of Austria. The architectural elegance of its monasteries (Melk Abbey and Göttweig Abbey), castles and ruins combined with the urban architecture of its towns and villages, and the cultivation of vines as an important agricultural produce are the dominant features of the valley.

The Wachau was inscribed as "Wachau Cultural Landscape" in the UNESCO List of World Heritage Sites in recognition of its architectural and agricultural history, in December 2000.

== History ==
=== Ancient history ===
Even before the Neolithic period brought in changes in the natural environment of the valley, Palaeolithic records of the valley have been identified in the form of "figurines" in Galgenberg and Willendorf, stated to be 32,000 years and 26,000 years old, respectively, that testify to human occupation in the valley. It has been inferred that Krems and Melk were well settled establishments in the early Neolithic period between 4500 BC and 1800 BC. Wachau Valley's ancient history in the Neolithic period started with deforestation by the people of the land for cultivation and settlement.

In 15 BC, the Celtic kingdom of Noricum became part of the Roman Empire. Since then, the Empire's boundaries were made up along the Danube. The fortifications of the limes were built along its southern banks, especially Castrum Favianis (what is now Mautern an der Donau) at the downstream end of the valley and some burgi (i.e., small watchtower-like fortresses) in the area of Rossatz-Arnsdorf municipality, the remains of which can still be seen today, most notably in Bacharnsdorf. Roman rule on the southern banks of the Danube came to an end when King Odoaker ordered the evacuation of the Latin speaking population in 488 AD.

The name "wachu", as such, was recorded as "locus Wahowa" in 853 AD and the name of "Krems" was recorded as Urbs Chremisa in 995 AD, marking it as the oldest Austrian town.

=== Dukedom of Babenberg ===
The Babenberg Margraves, with Leopold I as their first king, ruled in Wachau from 976 AD. The 11th century marked an Austrian dukedom of Babenberg under Henry II, in 1156. After the dissipation of this line of rule, Duke Albert V (King Albert II) came to power in 1404. Between 1150 and 1839, the four towns of St Michael, Wösendorf, Joching, and Weissenkirchen functioned independently. However, they formed a single entity as Wachau or Tal Wachau only in 1972. In the 12th century, the King of England, Richard the Lionheart, was imprisoned at the Kuenringerburg castle above the Dürnstein town because he insulted the Babenberg Duke, Leopold V by showing disrespect to the Austrian flag. Even though he was travelling in Austria returning from the Holy Lands in disguise, he was identified in an inn in Erdberg, now a suburb of Vienna. He was finally released after paying a kingly ransom of 35,000 kg of silver. According to myth, the king's freedom was facilitated due to the efforts of his French aide Blondel. It is said that this silver booty was used to build Wiener Neustadt.

=== Vineyards ===
Substantial changes in the landscape were witnessed during the medieval period from the 9th century with the establishment of the Bavarian and Salzburg monasteries. During this process of development, economic needs necessitated the creation of vine terraces to manufacture and market wine. In the 17th century, the area brought under vineyards varied widely depending on the climate and also the marketability of its wine. Viticulture on the hill slopes was practiced from the 18th century but adjustments in acreage brought under viticulture and pasture, and viticulture and horticulture (fruits) became necessary to meet the economic conditions in the region. Concurrent with this, the country side also started developing and this closely affected the agricultural practices in the region. Green Veltliner and Riesling grapes are still grown on steep terraces along the Danube River in the Wachau Valley.

=== Urbanization ===
Between 1150 and 1839, the four towns of St. Michael, Wösendorf, Joching and Weissenkirchen functioned independently. However, they formed a single entity as Wachau or Tal Wachau only in 1972. Wachau also had its fair share of invasions. The Hungarians invaded in the 15th century, and Matthias Corvinus occupied Krems and Stein in 1477. Church Reformists' activities also made an impact between 1530 and 1620, with the Protestants finally getting subdued by the Göttweig Abbot Georg II Falb in 1612–1631; eleven Austrian Benedictine abbeys had lent full support in this victory. This had a profound impact on the religious culture of the valley with many churches, chapels and other monuments being built in the valley. The history of town development in the valley dates back to the 11th and 12th centuries. This development was of a homogeneous character with wooden buildings constructed for housing in irregularly shaped streets. However, stone as building material was introduced in the 15th and 16th centuries to replace the old wooden structures by the peasants and the burghers. Since 1950, the residential complexes have appeared in the upper periphery of the valley.

A feature of the valley is the layout of the winegrowers' farmsteads. They are laid in "oblong or U shape or L-shape" with two parallel set of buildings. The farmsteads also have the usual gated walls, facades, service buildings, and vaulted passages, which over the centuries have been modified. Baroque architecture is a dominant feature with the street fronts depicting "late-medieval/post-medieval oriels on sturdy brackets, statues in niches, wall paintings and sgraffito work, or remnants of paintwork or rich Baroque facades." The architectural features of the roof of a Wachau house comprise a sharp slope with a soaring hipped roof.

=== Modern history ===
From 1700 onwards (considered under the modern period), many renovation works were undertaken. These included the Melk Abbey rebuilt in 1702, the refurbishing of the Canons' Abbey in Dürnstein between 1715 and 1733, and major reconstruction works of Göttweig Abbey that began in 1719. However, in the late 18th and 19th centuries, there was a decline in its importance as a result of the closure of monasteries under the secular rule of the Bavarians. However, many events changed the situation with all local communities between Krems and Melk coming together to ensure economic development of the Wachau, since 1904, duly integrating historical legacy with modernity. Tourism and vineyards development protected by Government Laws are now the byword for the "Golden Wachau," as it is now nicknamed.

In the modern period, though, the 18th-century buildings are now integrated with the town layout, and they are used for the promotion of trade and crafts. The 15th and 16th centuries' ambiance is witnessed in the "towns' taverns or inns, stations for changing draught horses, boat operators' and toll houses, mills, smithies, or salt storehouses". The valley and the towns still preserve a number of castles of vintage value.

The Wachau was inscribed as "Wachau Cultural Landscape" in the UNESCO list of World Heritage Sites in December 2000 under category (ii) for its riverine landscape and under category (iv) for the medieval landscape that depicts architectural monuments, human settlements, and the agricultural use of its land. Even prior to the UNESCO recognition, on September 5, 1994, the Wachau area was officially brought under the ambit of the "Natura 2000", a network of European sites of the European Union, to ensure that development in the designated areas follow all rules and regulations. The designated area has 5000 historic monuments, though most of them are privately owned. However, the Federal Office of Historic Monuments (they also maintain a complete list of all historic monuments in Austria) and the Landeskonservatorat für Niederösterreich are responsible for the conservation of the historic cultural landscape of the Wachau.

== Geography ==
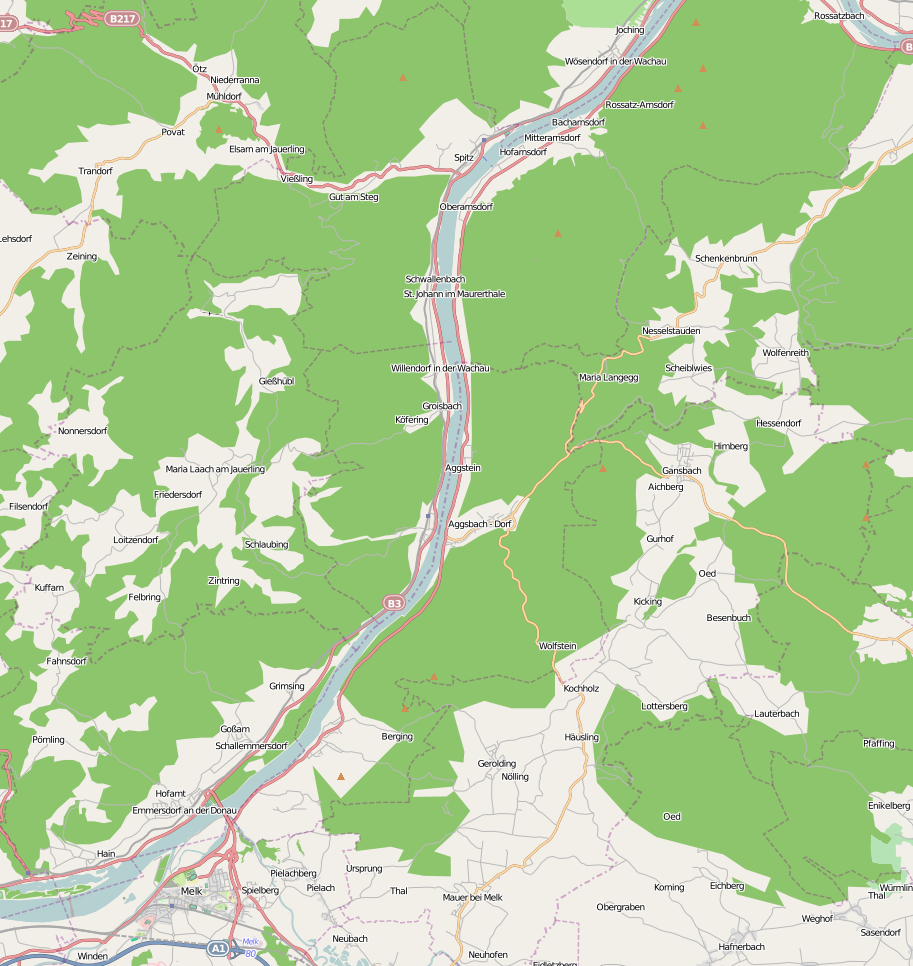
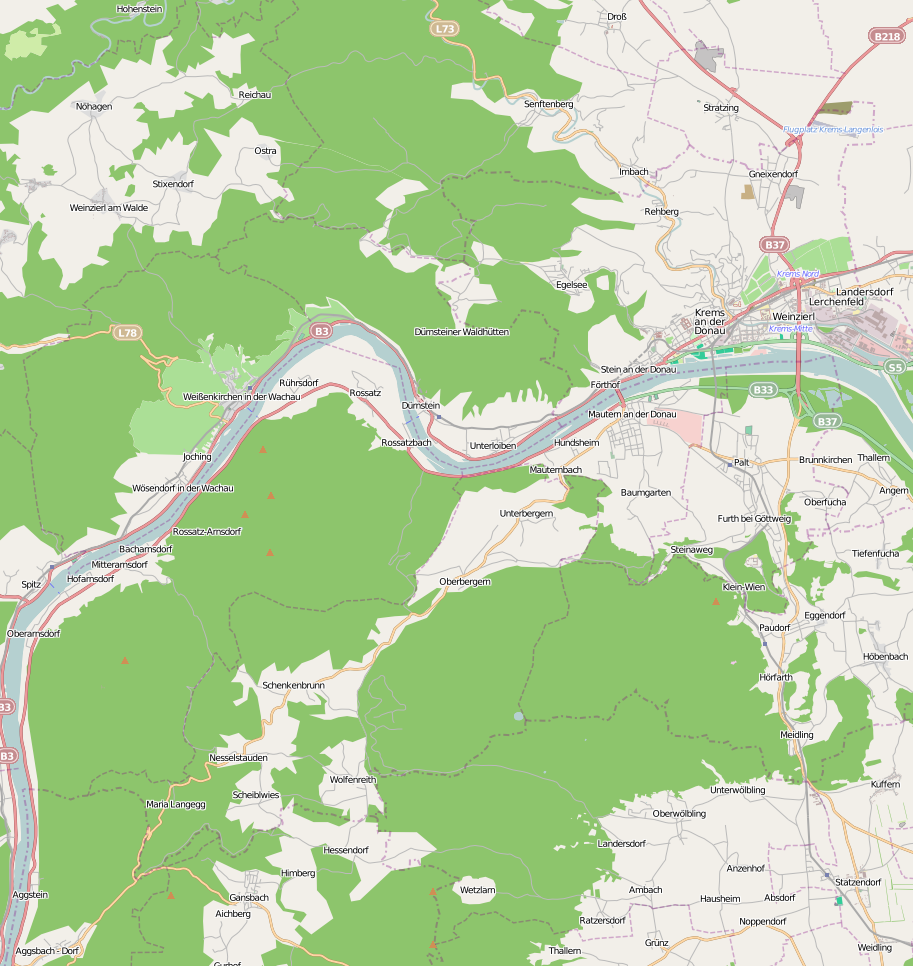
Maps of the Wachau valley (click each one three times to view clearly). Left: Upper Wachau, with the city of Melk in the southwest. Right: Lower Wachau, with the city of Krems in the northeast.

The Danube valley in Austria between the cities of Melk and Krems in Lower Austria is called the Wachau. This stretch of the valley includes the hills and the adjacent Dunkelsteiner Wald (Dunkelsteiner Forest) and the southern Waldviertel. The Danube river flows north-northeast from Melk to Dürnstein through a meander from which it flows southeast, then east past the city of Krems. In the Wachau, the town of Spitz lies on the Danube's western bank and the city of Melk on its eastern bank. Other important towns in the valley are Dürnstein, Weißenkirchen in der Wachau and Emmersdorf an der Donau, which have a galaxy of old homestead buildings dating from the mid-6th century. The railway line built in 1909 between Krems and Emmersdorf is a topographical marvel. Other settlements of note in the Wachau valley include Aggsbach, Bachamsdorf, Bergern im Dunkelsteinerwald, Furth bei Göttweig, Joching, Maria Laach am Jauerling, Mautern an der Donau, Mühldorf, Oberamsdorf, Oberloiben, Rossatz-Arnsdorf, Ruhrsdorf, Schwallenbach, Schönbühel-Aggsbach, Unterloiben and Willendorf.

The Danube River has a good network consisting of an inland navigation system. The Wachau valley historic sights can be visited by steamer boats; the best season to visit is between May and September. Autobahn services are also available from Vienna to visit all the important places in the Wachau. The well-developed road network between Melk and Krems follows the contour of the valley. However, there are no bridges across the Danube River in this region, and ferries are the only way to cross the river.

=== Towns ===
==== Melk ====
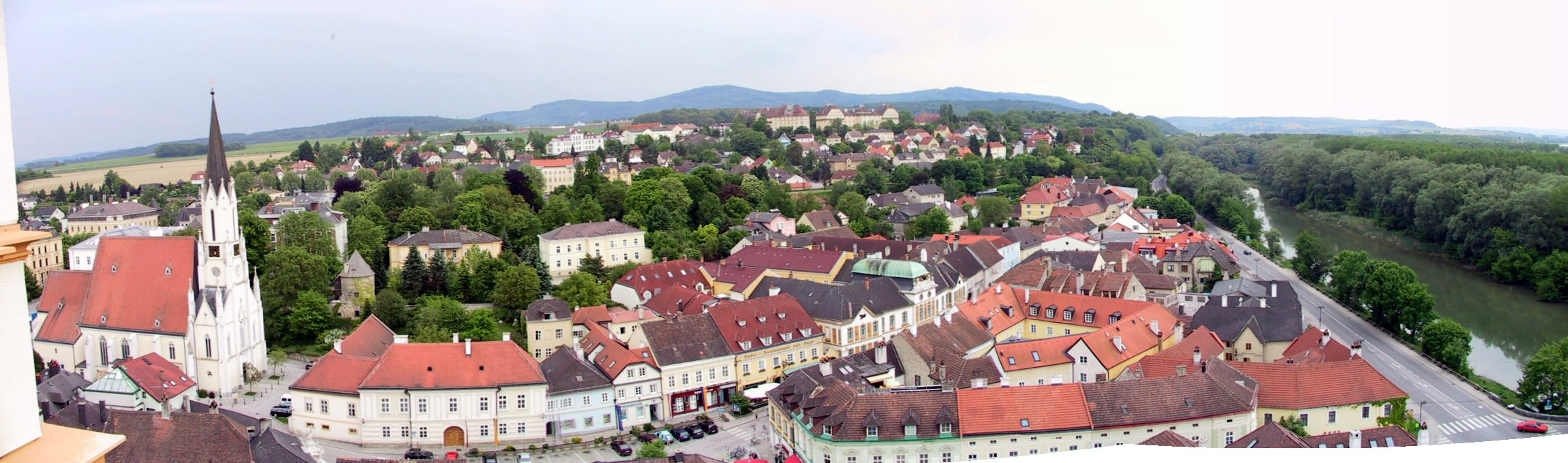
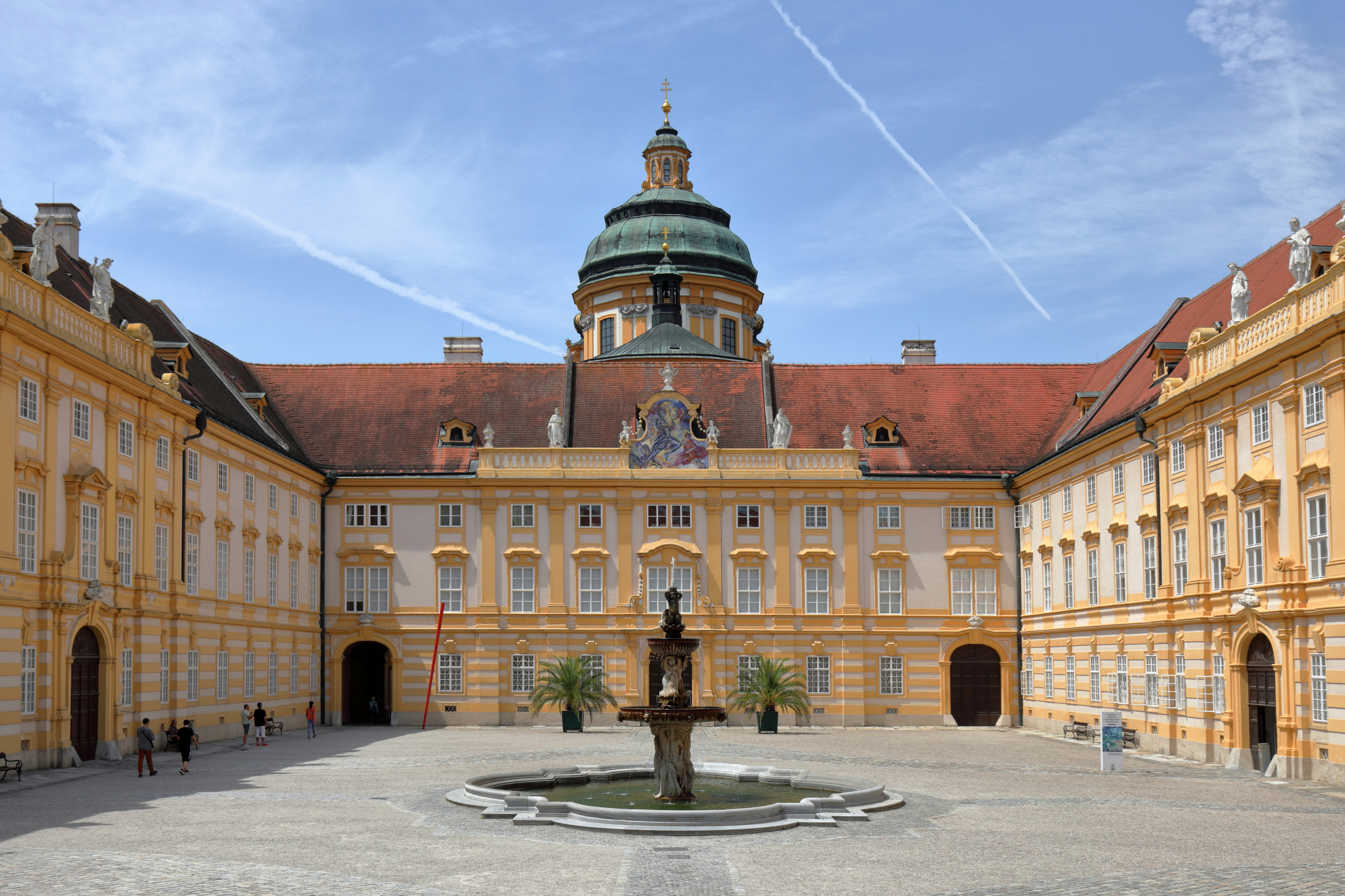
Left: Melk as seen from the heights of the Abbey. Right: Courtyard of the Abbey

Set in the Wachau and depicting the politics of the times, the epic German poem "Nibelungenlied" was written around 1200, Fragments of this epic was discovered in the monastic library of Melk, which are also displayed there. Melk is a small town on the bank of the Danube at the start of the Wachau region at an elevation of 228 metres (748 ft). An ancient town with its historicity linked to the Romans (as a border post) and also to Babenbergs' times (as their strong fortress), known then as the Namare Fort, which the residents call as the Medelke of the Nibenlunggenlied or the Babenberg fortress. Its present population is reported to be 5300. Its large enticing popularity is on account of the Benedictine abbey (founded in 1089 AD), perfect example of a "Baroque synthesis of the arts" which forms the western gateway to the Wachau, which is located on a 200 feet (61 m) high cliff. There is baroque gateway at the entrance.

The basic layout of the town below the Abbey is dated to the 11th and 12th centuries. However, many of the present day historic buildings in the main streets of the town are from 16th to 18th century. The most prominent streets laid out from the town hall square (Rathausplatz) are the Hauptstrasse (the main street) and Sterngasse, which is oldest street of the town. Buildings in these streets and the square include the former Lebzelterhaus dated to 1657, now a pharmacy and the Rathaus, dated to 1575, which has a large entrance door made of wood and copper, both in the Rathausplatz square; and an over-four-hundred-year-old bakery with shingle roof. A well-conserved ancient grapevine groove is located next to the Haus am Stein behind the Sterngasse. The Danube River bank shows marks of past flood levels at the shipping master's house. Also of interest is the old post office building of 1792, established by the then-postmaster Freiher von Furnberg; this functions now as a convention centre. Another dominant feature in the town is the Birago Barracks, built during 1910–13. In the peripheral area of the town, buildings built in the latter half of the 19th century and early 20th century are seen in their original condition. However, a district of villas replicating the Wiener Cottage Verein can also be seen here now. A1 Autobahn between Vienna and Salzburg has a station close to the town centre. Melk also has many cycle trails, which are popular.

==== Krems ====
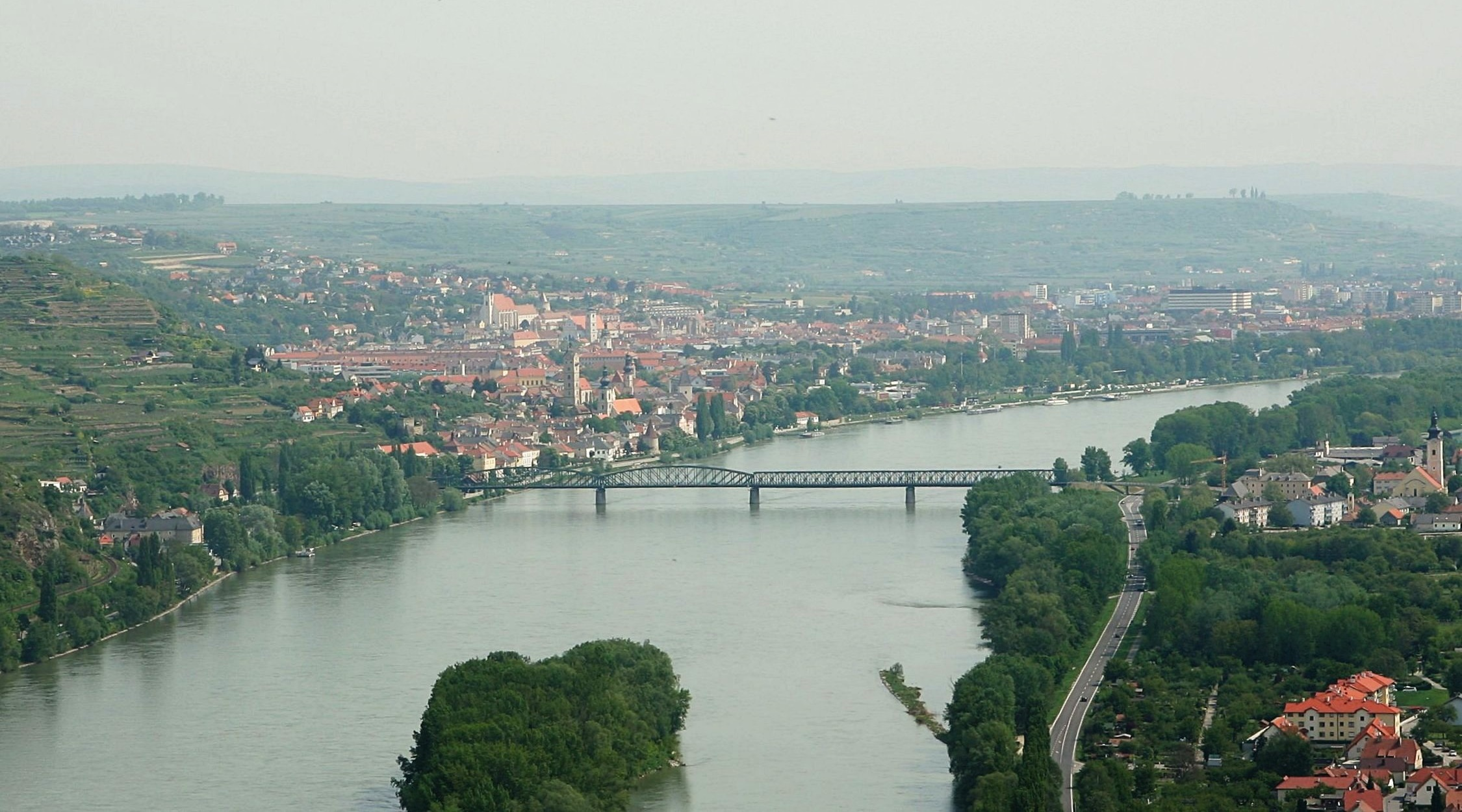
The western city area of Krems on the northern banks of the Danube River

Krems, which includes the town of Stein, an old town located between the Kremser Tor and Gottweigerhof is home to many historical buildings, as well as the pedestrian streets of Obere and Untere Landstrasse. Krems has long been popular for wine trade due to its terraced vineyards. The Minorite Church was the parish church in the old town, and is now used to hold art exhibitions. Apart from this Gothic church, the town also has the Pfarrkirche St. Nikolaus Church. A medieval gate erected in 1480, known as the Steiner Tor, is another feature.

==== Spitz ====
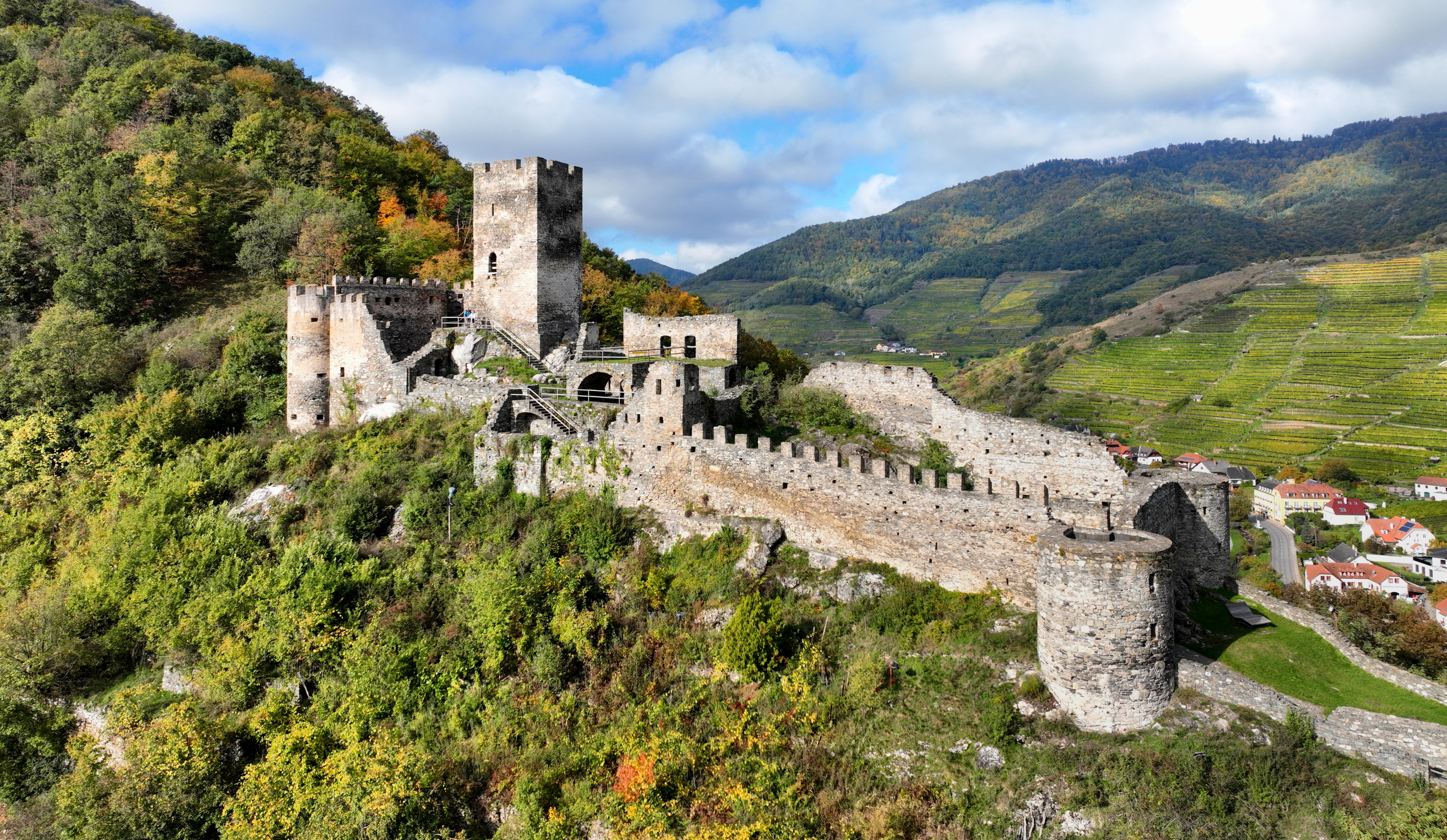
Hinterhaus ruins in Spitz an der Donau

Spitz is a small town with cobbled streets amidst vineyards and views of the Danube valley. It is 17 kilometres (11 mi) from Krems. Occupied since Celtic times, it was first mentioned in 830. To the south of Spitz is the fortress of Hinterhaus.

==== Dürnstein ====
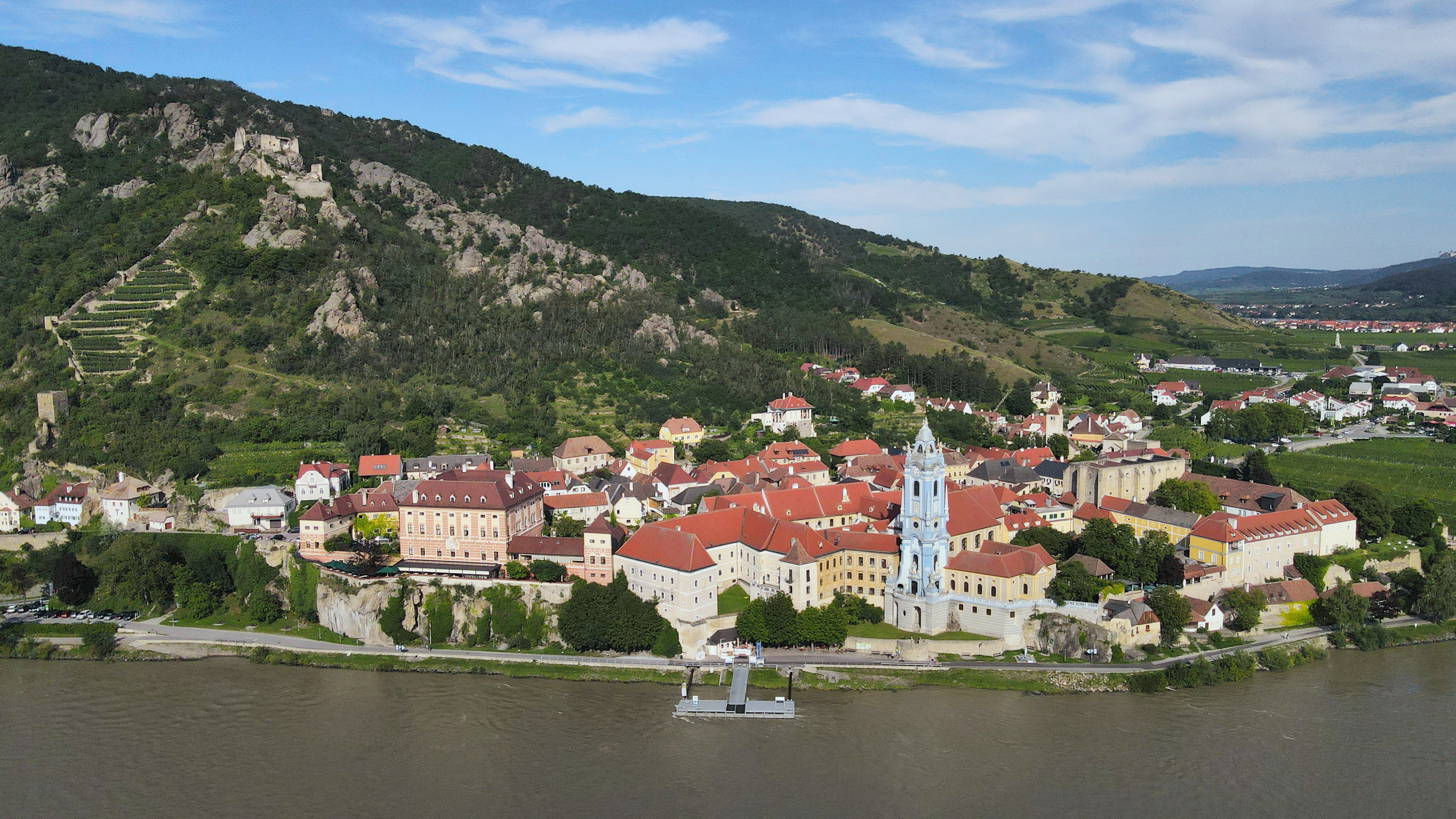
Aerial view of Dürnstein

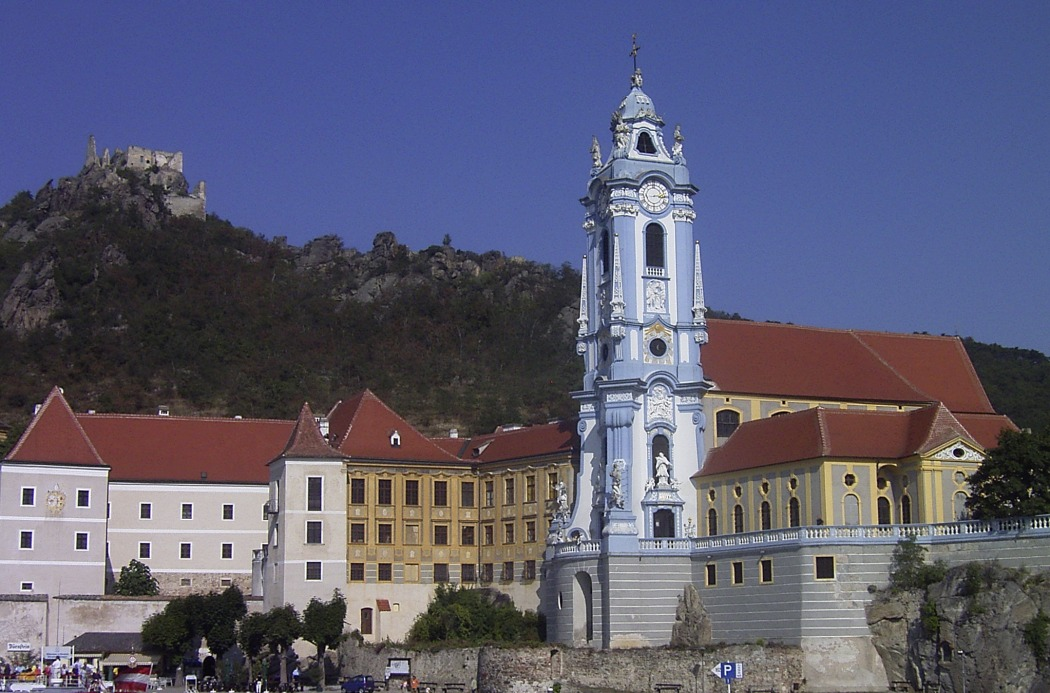
Left: Dürnstein town. Right: Durnstein castle in ruins

The town of Dürnstein was established in 1019 AD on a rocky promontory along a gentle curve of the Danube river, in the midst of the Wachau valley. Known then as Tirnstein, and described later as the "most romantic place for the picturesque ancient terraced vineyards and monuments, in the Wachau", it was built at an elevation of 630 feet (190 m) with fortifications for the settlement and protection against floods. It is 73 km upstream of Vienna. The small walled town, located 9 kilometres (5.6 mi) upstream of Krems, is known for its scenic environment. The town is also well known for some of the residential buildings on the main street; one such building is the refurbished building of Chorherrenstift, which was originally a monastery built in 1410. It was restored in the 18th century.

==== Willendorf ====
Willendorf, 21 kilometres (13 mi) from Krems, is the place where the primitive naked statue called the "Venus of Willendorf" - made in chalkstone, 11 cm long - was discovered in 1908. One of the preeminent examples of prehistoric art, it is widely considered to be a fertility goddess. The statue is estimated to be 25,000 years old and is now on display at the Natural History Museum in Vienna; a replica is seen in the museum in Willendorf.

A postage stamp of Euro value 3.75 of the Venus von Willendorf was released on August 7, 2008, to mark the 100-year celebrations since the discovery of the Venus.

==== Artstetten-Pöbring ====
Artstetten-Pöbring is a small town in the Melk district most known for Artstetten Castle, which is noted for its many onion-shaped domes. The castle has been refurbished many times over the past 700 years. It is famous for the fact that the Archduke Franz Ferdinand was the former owner of the castle. A museum in the castle has pictures of the life history of "the one and only Duke" and his wife during their stay in the castle. The duke and his wife were assassinated during their visit to Sarajevo, which triggered World War I. The castle also houses their tomb.

=== Geology ===
The river valley's geological formation is mainly of crystalline rocks, interspersed with Tertiary and Quaternary deposits in the wider reaches of the valley, and also in the Spitzer Graben. The land formation in the valley is dictated by the clay and silt deposits around Weissenkirchen and at the beginning of the Wachau stretch. A major tributary, which joins the Danube in Wachau on its left bank, is the Spitzer Graben, which is stated to be " part of the primeval Danube." During the Tertiary period, the flow of this river was to the west of the Wachau, on its northern border. The course of the river seen now is from Spitz onwards. The river is flowing along a weak fault zone on the southern border of the Bohemian Massif.

== Wine ==
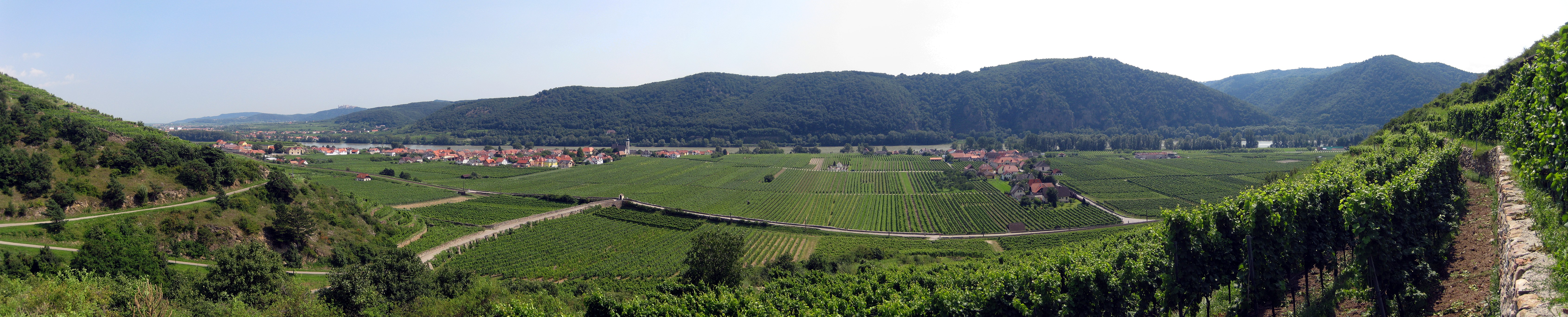
Wachau Valley, near Dürnstein (Unterloiben on the left and Oberloiben)

The origin of the wine growing tradition in Austria, and in particular in the Wachau valley, and its popularity beyond its borders, is attributed to medieval period of the Roman settlements. The Vinea Wachau Nobilis Districts date to Leuthold I von Kuenring (1243–1313). Wine production peaked under the Carolingians. Krems has a long history as the hub of the Wachau wine trade, while the town of Dürnstein is also known for being one of the Wachau wine centres. Founded in 1983, the Vinea Wachau is an association of vintners who created categories for Wachau wine classification. The vintners of the Vinea Wachau claim to produce quality wine under a manifesto of six Vinea Wachau wine making laws, also known as six Wachau commandments. Their products, known for their purity, are labelled under the categories of Steinfeder, Federspiel or Smaragd.

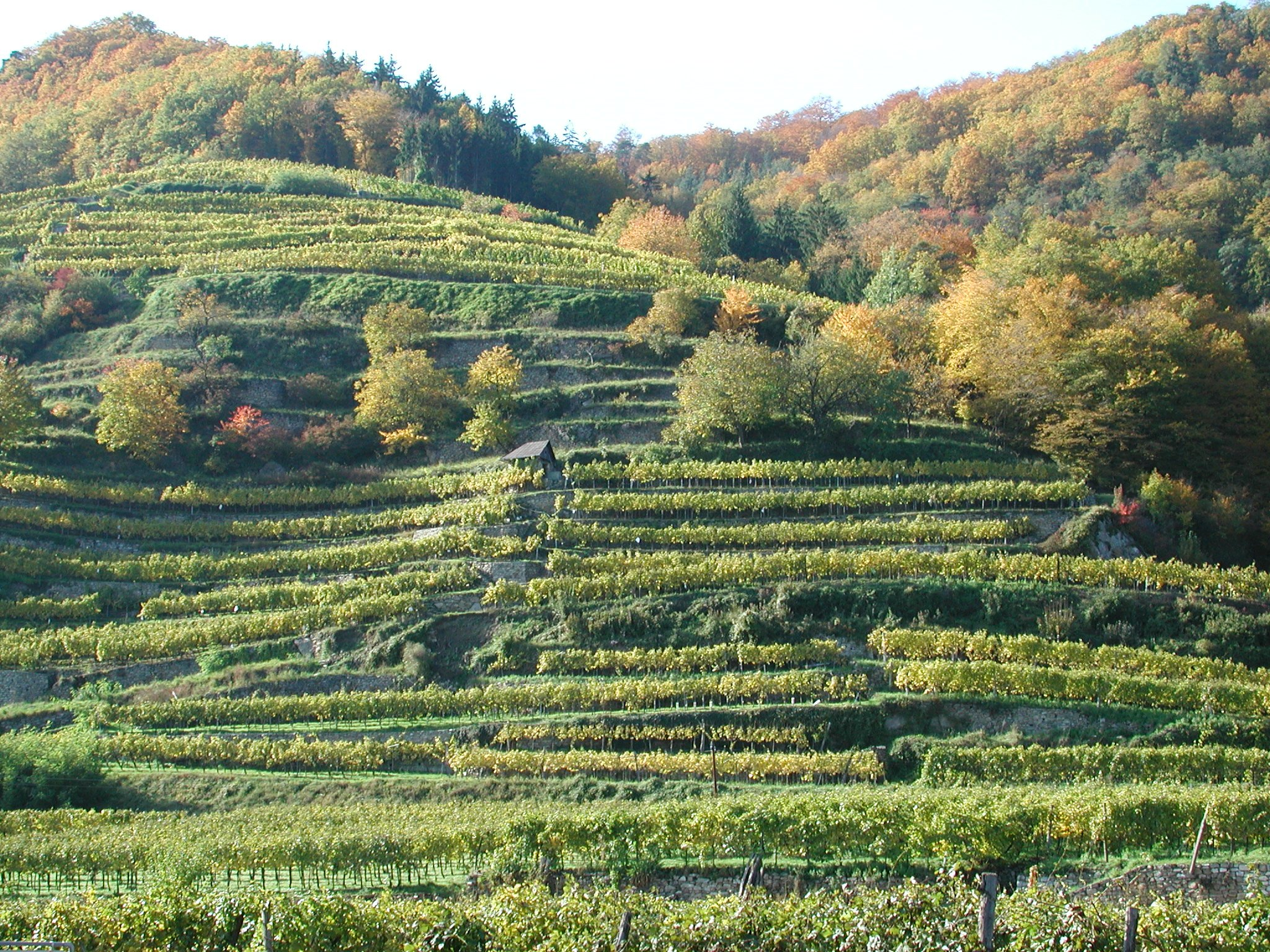
Terraced vineyards in the Wachau region.

The Wachau valley is well known for its production of apricots and grapes, both of which are used to produce specialty liquors and wines. The wine district's rolling vineyards produce complex white wines. Wachau is a source of Austria's most prized dry Rieslings and Grüner Veltliners, some of the best from the steep stony slopes next to the Danube on which the vines are planted. The temperature variation in the valley between day and cold nights has a significant role to play in the process of ripening of the grapes. The heat retained in the water and the stoney slopes with thin soil cover facilitates this process of growing fine variety of grapes, which results in the sophisticated wines produced in the valley. Since rainfall is not adequate for the growth of wines on thin soils, irrigation is an essential requirement to give water supply to the wine yards.

== Historical monuments ==
The historical monuments in the Wachau valley are more than 5000. Some of them are: The Benedictine abbeys of Melk (Stift Melk a massive baroque Benedictine monastery) and Göttweig (a monastery of canons regular), at the beginning and end of the scenic Wachau section of the Danube Valley from where one gets a visual feast of the city of Melk; the Schallaburg Castle, a Renaissance style castle 4 kilometres (2.5 mi) from Melk; the Steiner Tor in Krems or Krems an der Donau, the late-Gothic Piarist church; Dürnstein for its wine growing area and the Dürnstein castle; and the Burgruine Aggstein.

=== Melk Abbey ===
Melk Abbey is a Benedictine abbey, and one of the world's most famous monastic sites. It is located above the town of Melk on a granite rocky outcrop at an elevation of 228 metres (748 ft) overlooking the river Danube in Lower Austria, adjoining the Wachau valley, about 40 km upstream of Krems. It is built over an area of 17,500 square metres (188,000 sq ft).

The abbey was founded in 1089 AD when Leopold II, Margrave of Austria gave one of his castles to Benedictine monks from Lambach Abbey. Monks have lived here since then. A school was founded in the 12th century, and the monastic library soon became renowned for its extensive manuscript collection. The library has a collection of 100,000 books including manuscripts and 750 volumes printed prior to 1500 CE, described as "incunabula." The monastery's scriptorium was also a major site for the production of manuscripts. In the 15th century, the abbey became the centre of the Melk Reform movement which reinvigorated the monastic life of Austria and Southern Germany.

=== Schallaburg Castle ===
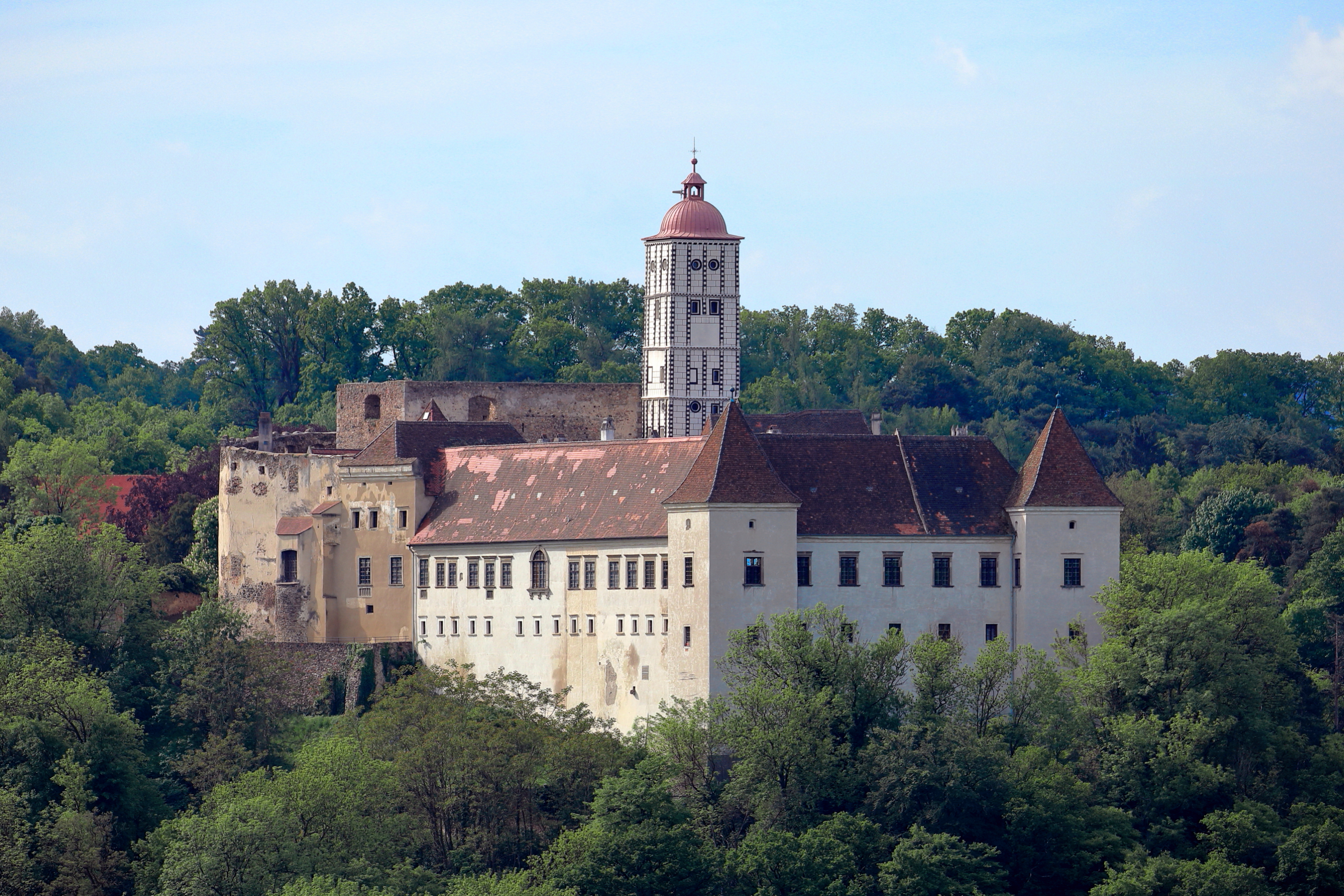
Schallaburg

Schallaburg Castle, located in the municipality of Schollach, is one of the best-known Renaissance style castles in Lower Austria north of the Alps. Schallaburg Renaissance Castle is located 5 kilometres (3.1 mi) from Melk, in the region known as Mostviertel. The central part of the castle was built in the Middle Ages, in 1572, by the Lose Steiner dynasty. It depicts a unique combination of a Romanesque residential castle and the Gothic chapel, patterned on the Italian palazzo style, which was in vogue then. Aesthetically built, it has a well-decorated two-storied arcaded court with elegant cantilevered staircases and a courtyard. The decorations are in terracotta mosaic vividly depicting mythological figures, gods, masks and remarkable human beings and animals; a legendary mythical figurine here is known as "Hundefräulein" (a female human figure with a dog's head). At the gate entrance to the castle, there are two large "smoke-spewing dragons", each 30 metres (98 ft) long and 6 metres (20 ft) high. Its culturally rich Mannerist gardens have wide range of roses, ornamental trees and bushes and herbs planted in the gardens in the town, as also two Renaissance apple orchards.

=== Steiner Tor ===
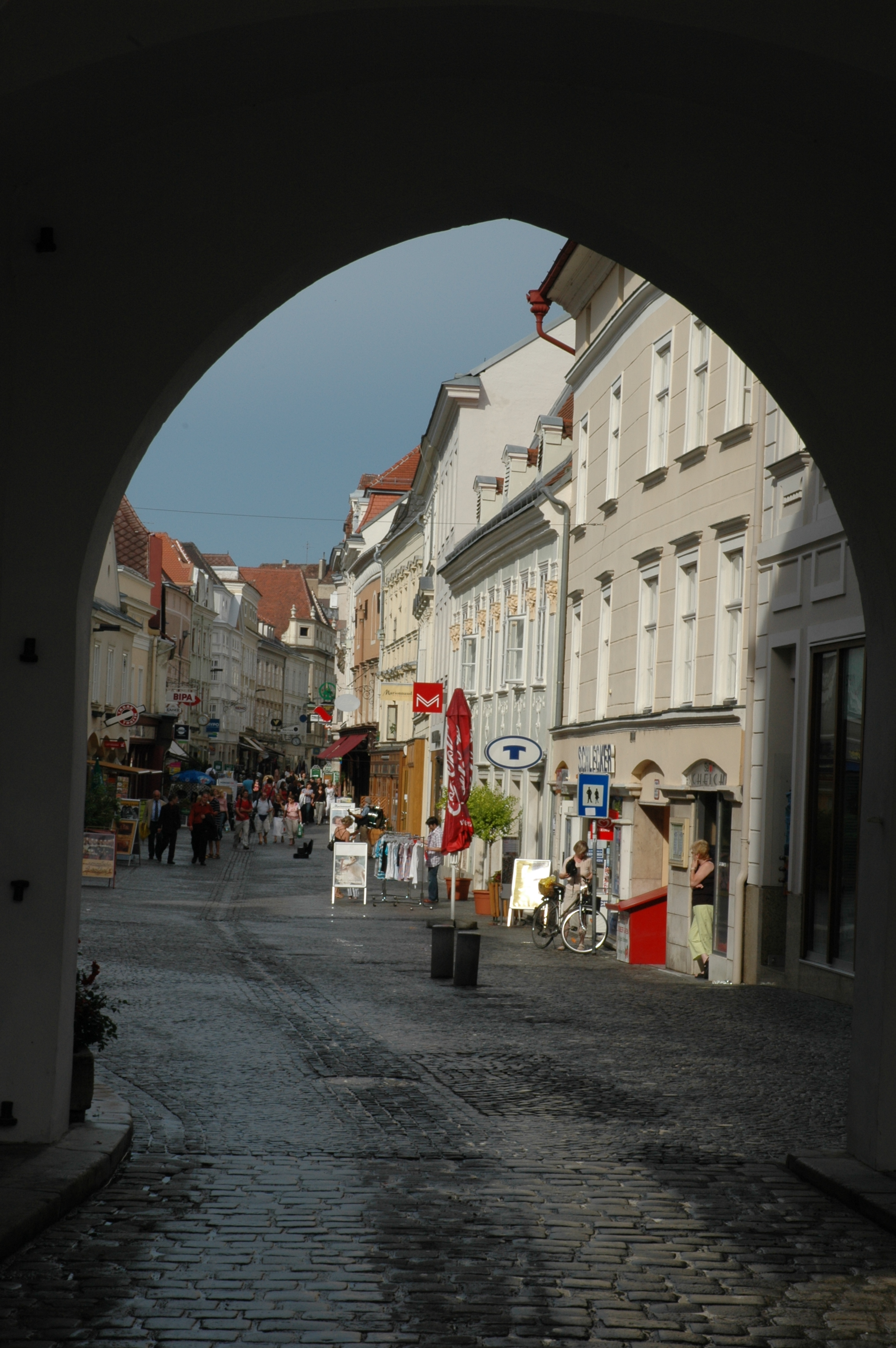
Left: Steiner Tor. Right: Landscape of Steiner Tor.

Steiner Tor is a-preserved gate in the city of Krems, originally built in the late 15th century but refashioned in the Baroque style. It is considered the symbol of the city. Until the last third of the 19th century, the city of Krems was surrounded by a wall. This was systematically razed, and three gates were also removed. From 2005, celebrating the 700-year anniversary of the city rights, the Steiner Tor was restored as much to its original as possible.

=== Gothic Piarist church ===
Gothic Piarist church in Krems was built in 1014. It was refurbished in mid 15th century. Its choir was consecrated in 1457 and later sanctified again in 1508 following the adaptations. Its frescoes and altar are credited to the famous artist Martin Johann Schmidt in Baroque architectural style. The church was also the theological college of the Piarists between 1636 and 1641.

=== Göttweig Abbey ===
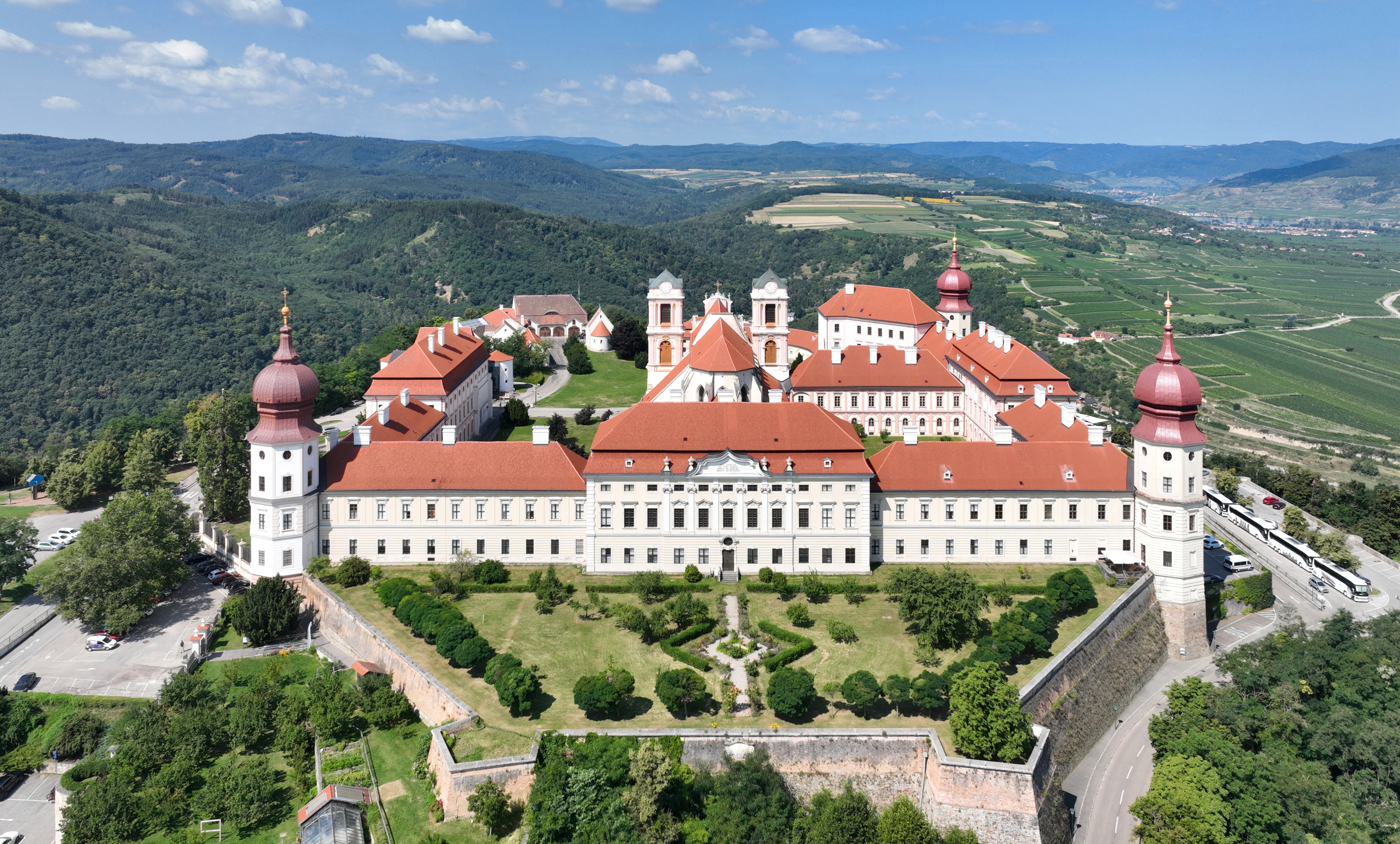
Göttweig Abbey

Göttweig Abbey, a Benedictine monastery near Krems, was founded as a monastery of canons regular by Blessed Altmann, Bishop of Passau. It is also known as the "Austrian Montecassino" named after the original Benedictine monastery in Italy. The high altar of the church was dedicated in 1072, but the monastery itself wasn't founded until 1083. Since 1625, the abbey has been a member of the Austrian Congregation, now within the Benedictine Confederation.

=== Burgruine Aggstein ===
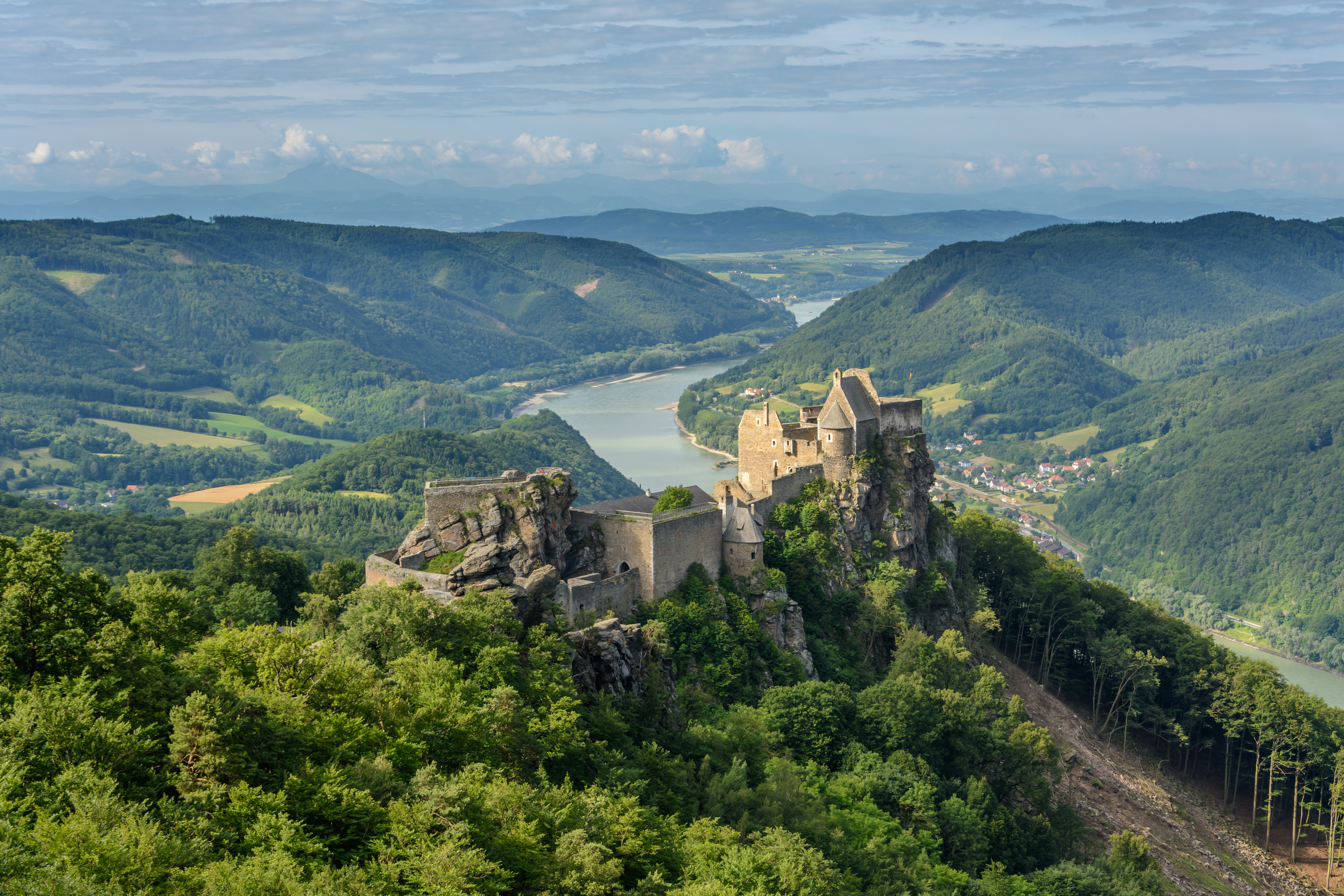
Burgruine Aggstein

Burgruine Aggstein is the remnant of a castle on the right bank of the Danube, north of Melk. It is 15 kilometres (9.3 mi) from Melk. According to archaeological excavations of the foundations of the castle it has been inferred that the castle was built in the early part of the 12th century.

=== Schloss Schönbühel ===
Schloss Schönbühel is also a 12th-century castle located on a hill about 5 kilometres (3.1 mi) from Melk.

== See also ==
- List of World Heritage Sites in Austria
