= Rossatz-Arnsdorf =

- Municipality
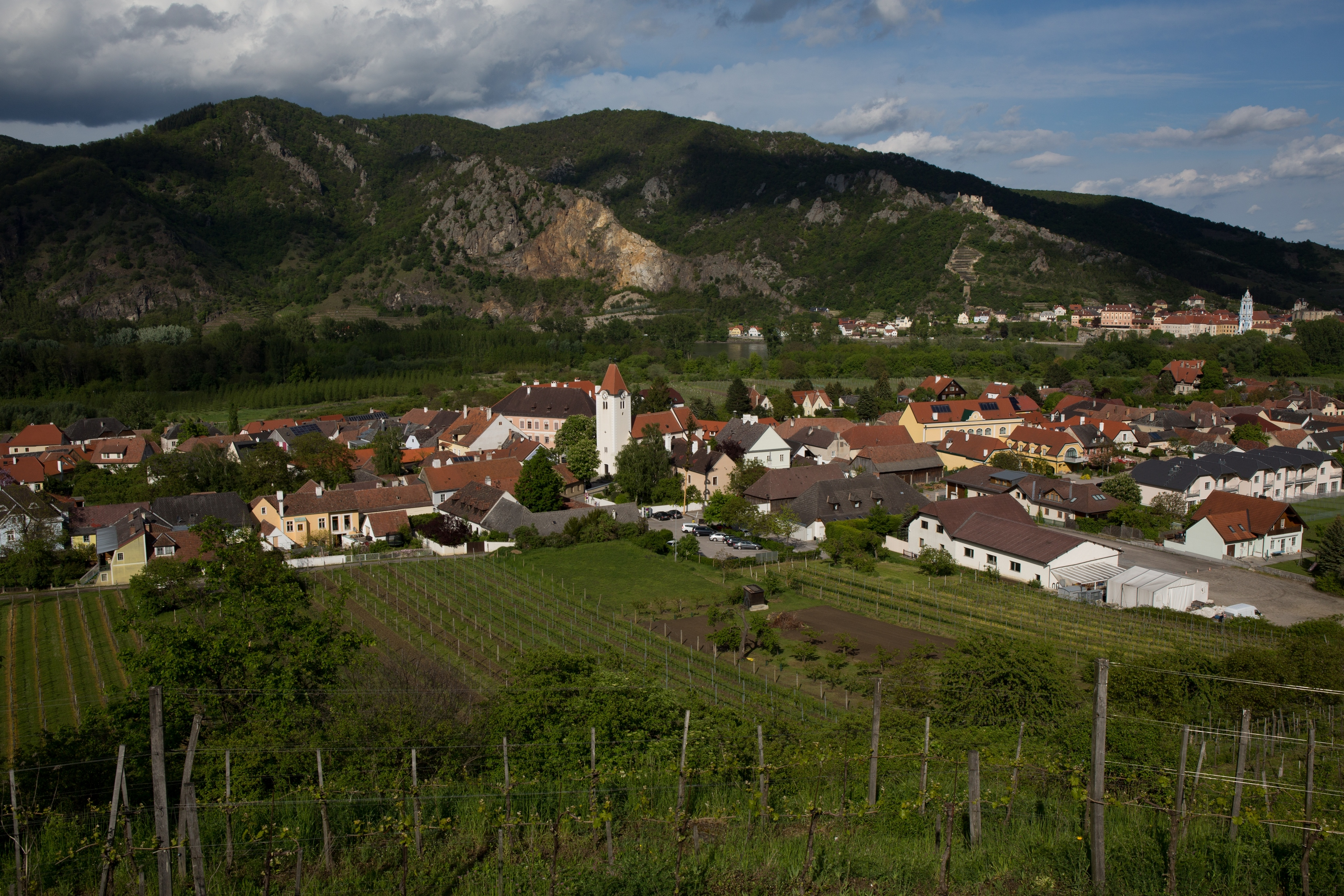

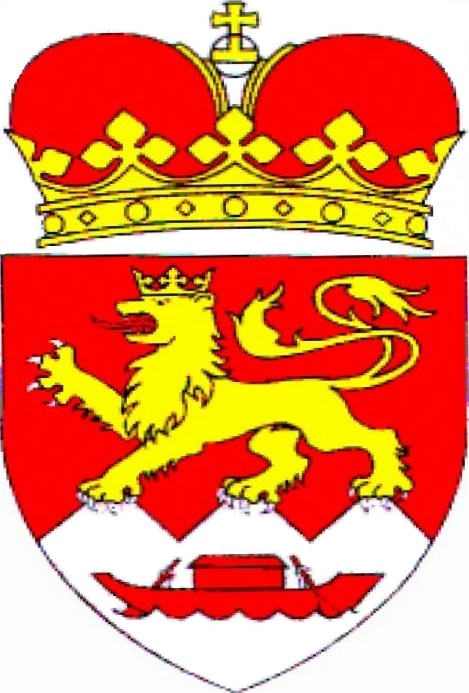
- Coat of arms

- Location within Austria
- Coordinates: 48°24′N 15°30′E
- Country: Austria
- State: Lower Austria
- District: Krems-Land

Government
  - Mayor: Franz Schütz

Area
  - Total: 39.04 km^{2} (15.07 sq mi)
- Elevation: 225 m (738 ft)

Population (2018-01-01)
  - Total: 1,065
  - Density: 27.28/km^{2} (70.65/sq mi)
- Time zone: UTC+1 (CET)
  - Summer (DST): UTC+2 (CEST)
- Postal code: 3602, 3621
- Area code: 02714
- Website: www.rossatz-arnsdorf.at

Rossatz-Arnsdorf is a town in the district of Krems-Land in the Austrian state of Lower Austria. It is located in the Wachau valley of the Danube, a popular destination for tourists, and has excellent views of the ruins of castle Dürnstein, where King Richard the Lion-Heart of England was held captive by Duke Leopold V.

== History ==
Evidence of 7th century Slavic settlement has been found on the steep slope of the Danube valley. In addition, place and field names with Slavic roots are common in the area. At the beginning of the 9th century, Emperor Charlemagne donated the territory of the Benedictine Abbey of St. Michael in Metten. The first documentary mention of "Rosseza" dates to about 985. From the 11th century, the place was owned by the Babenbergs and was expanded into the 13th century. In 1258, a judge is mentioned in a document. As a result, various sacred and secular lordships had possessions in Rossatz. In the 15th century, Emperor Frederick III granted Rossatz market rights.

From the early 16th century until about 1630, Rossatz was Protestant. After that date, the Counter-Reformation reinstated the Catholic Church. From the 15th century, the place changed hands often; for example, the Wallsee family, the families of Spaur and Kirchberger, and also Geymann of Gallspach. In 1768, Rossatz was united with the Lordship of Mautern owned by Count Schönborn-Puchheim.

Since about 1170, there are documented evidence of viticulture in the area. After purchase of the former noble plots, there was founded the Rossatz forest and estate cooperative in 1859. The current agricultural community produces several varieties of Wachau wine.

In both 1626 and 1886, Rossatz was devastated by fires.

=== Possessions of the Prince-Bishop of Salzburg ===
Almost 9 km up the Danube, the small villages of Bach-, Ober- und Mitter-Arnsdorf belonged to the Prince-Bishop of Salzburg from its foundation in 860. It was mediatized to Austria by order of the Final Recess of the Extraordinary Imperial Delegation (Reichsdeputationshauptschluss) in 1803.

In 1971/72, the municipalities Mitter- and Oberarnsdorf were incorporated with Rossatz.

== Municipal subdivisions ==
The borough incorporates the following nine villages (in brackets the population as at 1 Jan 2015):

- Bacharnsdorf (36)
- Hofarnsdorf (79)
- Mitterarnsdorf (164)
- Oberarnsdorf (188)
- Rossatz (354)
- Rossatzbach (84)
- Rührsdorf (111)
- Sankt Johann im Mauerthale (2)
- Sankt Lorenz (15)

The borough comprises the cadastral municipalities of Mitterarnsdorf, Oberarnsdorf, Rossatz and Rührsdorf.

== Population ==
Historical population
Year	Pop.	±%
1971	1,172	—
1981	1,189	+1.5%
1991	1,127	−5.2%
2001	1,197	+6.2%
2011	1,120	−6.4%

== Twin towns ==
Rossatz-Arnsdorf is twinned with:

- Arnstorf, Germany
- Metten, Germany
