= Wachau (disambiguation) =

Wachau is an Austrian valley.

Wachau may also refer to:

- Wachau wine, an Austrian wine region
- Wachau, Saxony, a town in Germany
- Wachau, an area of Markkleeberg, Germany

== See also ==
- Battle of Wachau, 1813
