= Wachau wine =

Wine region in Austria

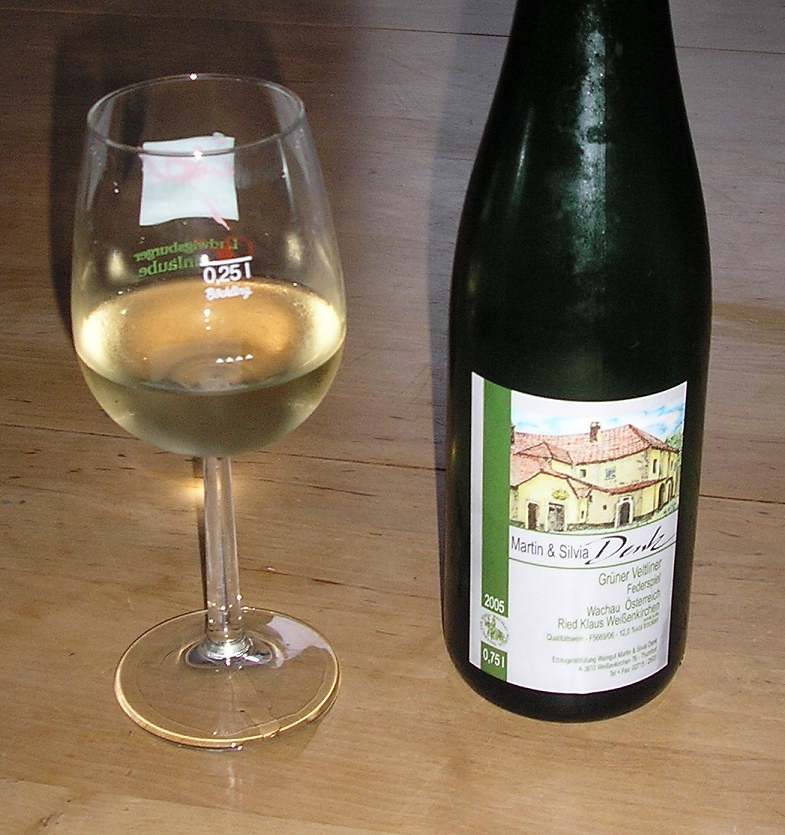
A Grüner Veltliner from the Wachau

Wachau is one of Austria's most established and notable wine regions, specializing in dry wines made from Riesling and Grüner Veltliner. Located in Lower Austria along the Danube, west of Vienna and Krems an der Donau, it is one of the westernmost wine producing regions in Austria with only a few scattered plantings in Tyrol being further west. While most of Austria follows a wine classification systems based on ripeness and harvest must weight that parallels the German wine classification system, Wachau wines have a unique classification system. The three classification levels for Wachau wine include Steinfeder for wines up to 11.5% alcohol level, Federspiel for wines between 11.5–12.5% and Smaragd that must have a minimum of 12.5% alcohol level. Despite its renown, the Wachau is a small wine region that usually accounts for only around 3% of Austria's wine production.

== History ==
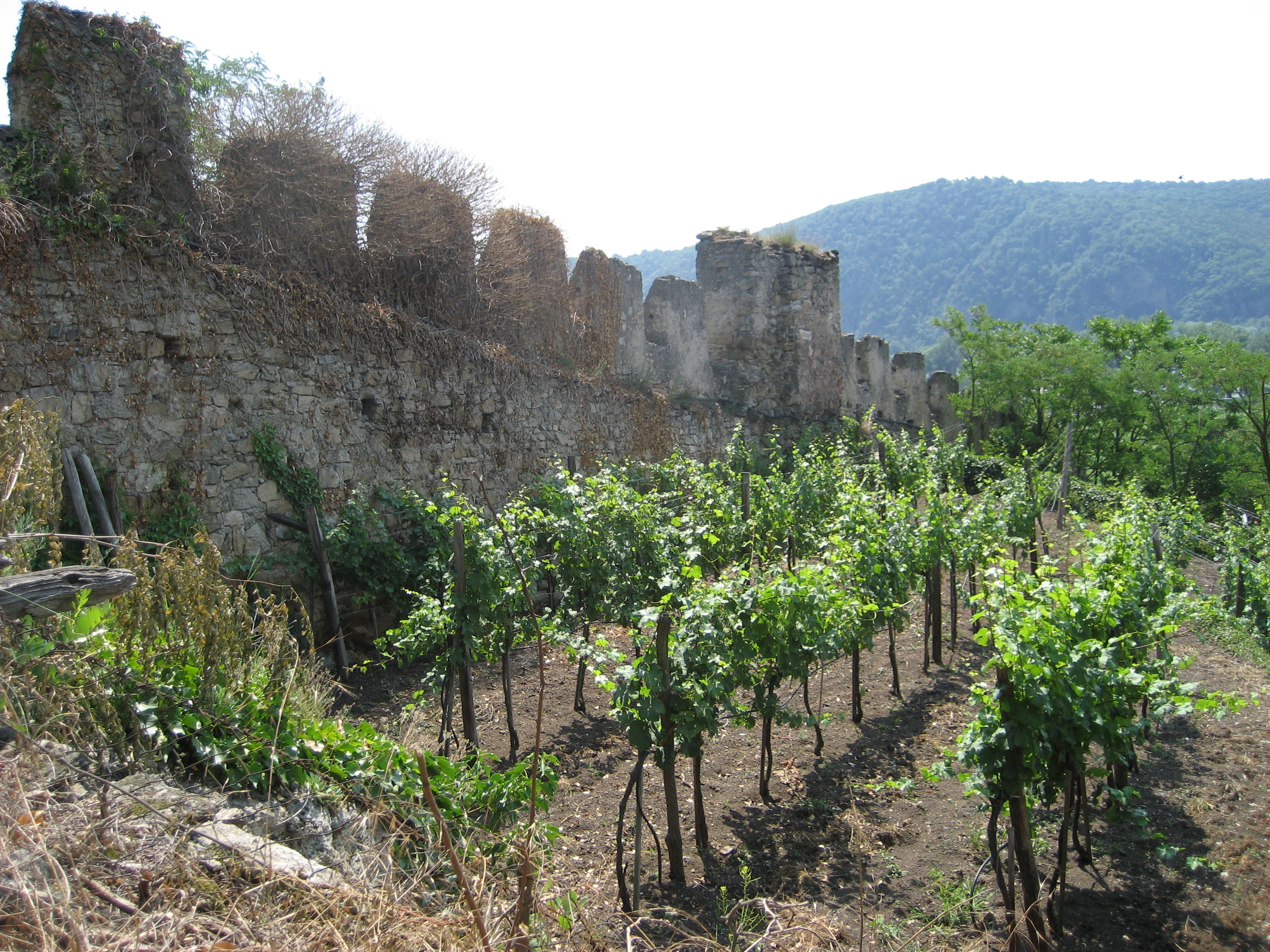
Vines planted near the ancient ruins in Wachau

Archaeological evidence suggests that viticulture may have been introduced to the lands around the Danube by the Celtic tribes, most notably the La Tène and Noricum federation, prior to the Roman influence that came into the area following conquest around the 1st century BCE. Viticulture continued to flourish under Roman rule, with the introduction of Roman technology and knowledge, even though grape growing was technically banned in Roman territories north of the Alps. In the 3rd century, Emperor Marcus Aurelius Probus officially overturned the ban and is reported to have ordered the introduction of several grape varieties to be brought into the territories. It has been speculated that both Grüner Veltliner and Welschriesling may have been introduced to the region during the Roman period.

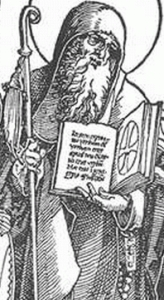
The first written account of wine production in the Wachau came from the biography of St. Severin of Noricum.

The first written account to specifically mention wine production in the Wachau region was the writings of Eugippus in his biography of St. Severin, where the 5th-century Roman wine production at the Roman fort near the town of Mautern in the Wachau. After the fall of the Roman Empire the Wachau region, along with most of Lower Austria down across the Pannonian Plain, was ravaged by repeated waves of barbarian invasions that took a toll on all forms of agriculture and trade. Wachau's wine industry entered a dark age from which it did not emerge until the time of Charlemagne in the late 8th and early 9th century. Under the rule of the Holy Roman Empire, the monastic influences of the Christian church continued to promote and sustain viticulture in the area. Much as the monasteries mapped out and planted plots along choice lands in the Burgundy and Mosel wine regions, the monks in the Wachau identified vineyard sites along the northern banks of the Danube that would be ideal for viticulture. Many vineyards that exist today in the Wachau can trace their origins to monastic plantings in the Middle Ages and Renaissance period.

From the 14th–16th century, viticulture in the Wachau hits its peak along with the rest of Lower Austria with plantings an estimated 10 times greater across the land than what exist today. This period saw a lack of profitability due to overproduction and competition from neighboring Germany and Hungary. As prices and influence in the important Vienna market were being affected, Wachau producers banded with neighboring Austrian producers to demand protectionist tariffs and eventually an outright ban on any "foreign" wine being imported into Lower Austria. These measures helped stabilize the Wachau wine industry to some degree until the Napoleonic Wars of the early 19th century, followed by the phylloxera epidemic that would reach Austria later that century, would devastate the vineyards of Wachau. Slowly the wine industry would recover and during the 20th century, the Wachau would gain a global reputation for the quality of its dry Riesling and Grüner Veltliner. Then the 1985 diethylene glycol wine scandal, caused by producers outside the Wachau, gained international attention and caused a dramatic drop in sales for Austrian wines across the board.

The Wachau, along with the rest of the Austrian wine industry, responded to the scandal with the development of strict wine laws and quality assurances. Producers in the Wachau already had a head start on this movement with the development a couple years earlier of the Vinea Wachau in 1983, a collaborative association that aimed to distinguish Wachau wine from other Austrian wines. In addition to holding its members to a guaranteed minimum quality level above the requirements of Austrian wine laws, the Vinea Wachau also established its own classification and wine labeling system that is still being used for Wachau wines today.

== Climate and geography ==
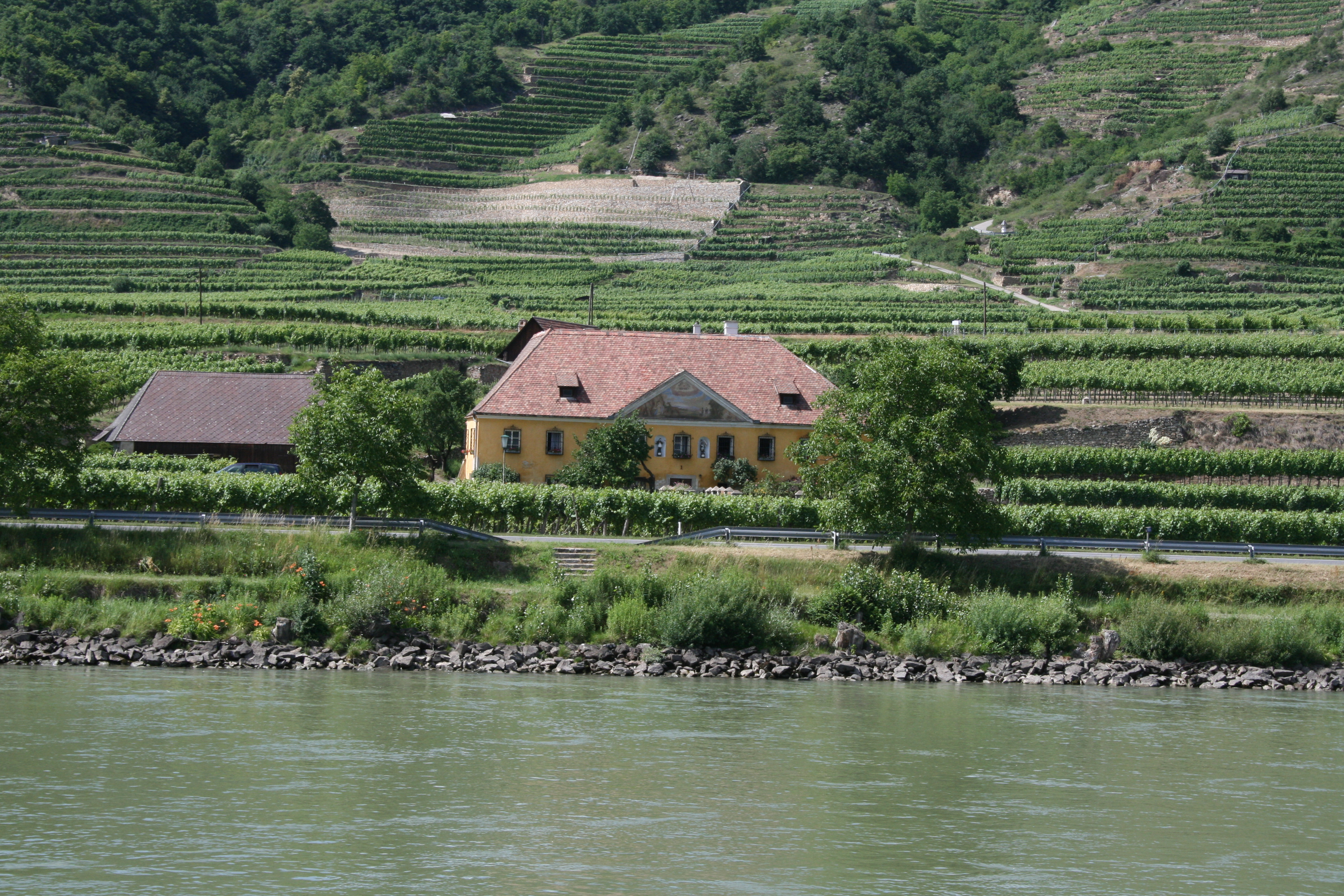
The Danube river provides a moderating influence on the vines grown along the terraced hills bordering the river.

The boundaries of the Wachau has traditionally been the valley of the Danube between the village of Melk and Krems. Along with the Kremstal and Kamptal, the Wachau is one of the coolest wine regions in Austria. The climate of Wachau is influenced by the confluence of several weather systems including cool, moist air from the Waldviertel forests of the northwest with warmer air coming from the east off the Pannonian Plain. This creates a continental climate with marked diurnal temperature variations that include a dramatic drop in nighttime temperatures. Along with the moderating influence of the Danube river, the Wachau has a macroclimate which includes constant air and heat circulation, allowing for sugars and phenolic compounds to build up during the day but acids and aromas to be preserved by the cooler nights. This creates white wines that tend to be high in extract and acidity. Irrigation is often necessary during the peak months of the growing season when yearly rain totals fall below 500 mm (20 in).

The vineyard soils of the Wachau are varied but consist primarily of rock outcrops with occasional layers of loess. The geography of the region is characterized by steep, rocky river banks (as steep as those found in the Mosel and Côte-Rôtie) that have had vineyards terraced into the hillsides. Higher up on the hills, the soils are rich in iron deposits and contain mixtures of gneiss, granite and slate. Closer to the river and in the flatter plains areas that dot the region, the soil is more alluvial with loess, sand and gravel. The heart of the Wachau district is the Vinea Wachau Nobilis Districtus which includes a strip of vineyard land that stretches 20 km (12 mi) from the western extremity of Schwallenbach along the Danube through Spitz, Weissenkirchen, Dürnstein, Loiben and finally to Mautern. There are over 900 named vineyard sites in Wachau (known as Rieden). Among the sites that may appear on Wachau wine labels those of the Loibenberg, Kellerberg, Achleiten, Klaus and Singerriedel are the most noted.

== Grape varieties and wine styles ==
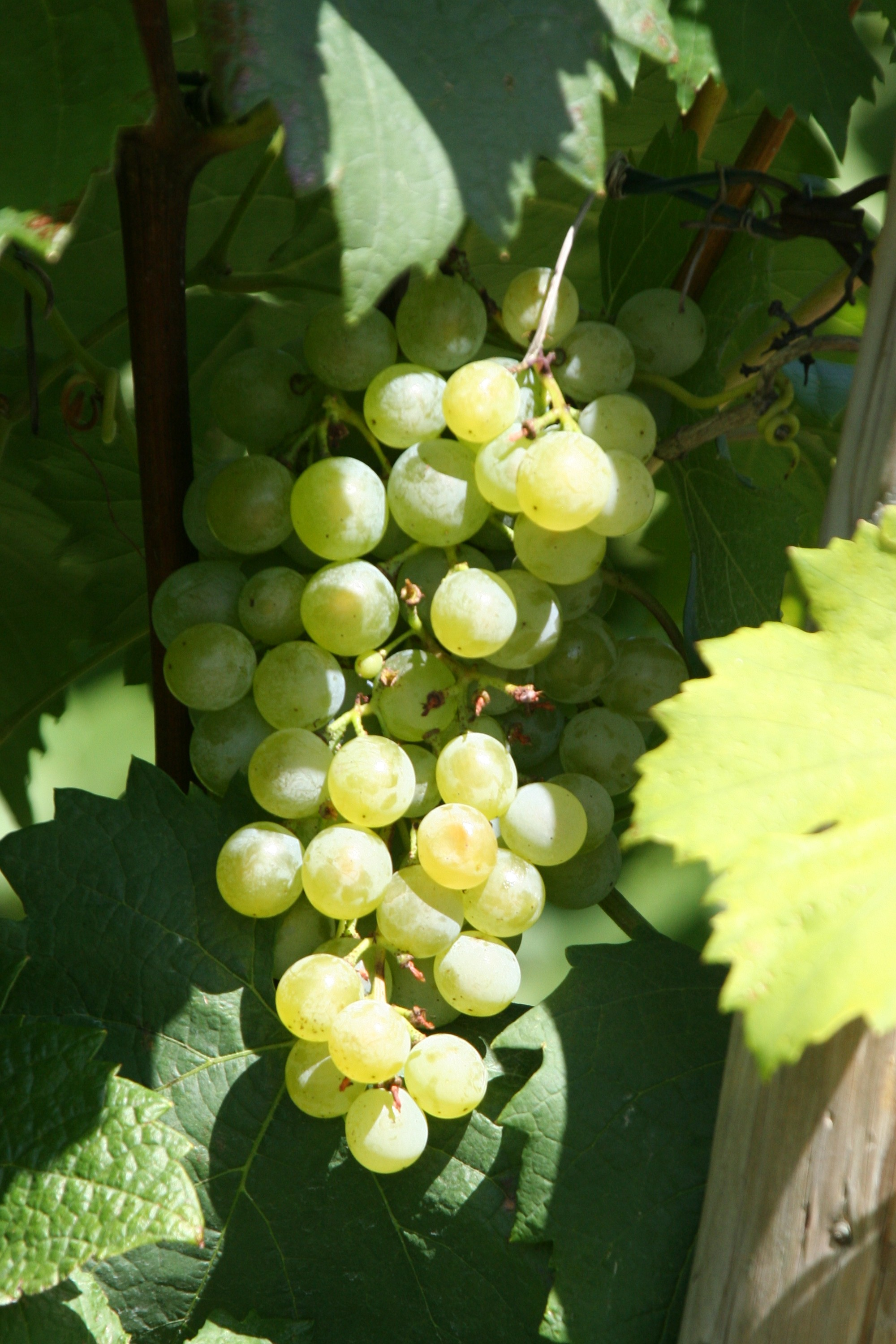
Grüner Veltliner

There are over 1,350 hectares (3,300 acres) of vineyards in the Wachau with Grüner Veltliner being the most widely planted. The area is also well known for its Riesling that carry distinctive trademarks of their terroir in aroma and flavor profile. Other varieties grown in the Wachau include Chardonnay (sometimes called Feinburgunder), Neuburger, Gelber Muskateller, Pinot blanc, Traminer and Sauvignon blanc. Riesling is often planted on the most ideal vineyard location along the steep gneiss hillsides near the river while Grüner Veltliners seems to thrive on the loess and sand of the lower banks. The wines are rarely, if ever, exposed to new oak or malolactic fermentation and are typically produced in a fuller bodied, higher extract style that is more similar to the wines of Alsace than of their German counterparts.

== Wine classification and labeling laws ==
Unlike most Austrian wines which follow a classification system similar to Germany (which includes wines labeled based on must weight at harvest such as Spätlese, Auslese, etc.), the Wachau has its own classification system for quality wine. In favorable vintages, producers may experience botrytis and can produce botrytized wines that carry the same classification as their counterparts in other Austrian wine regions—namely Beerenauslese and Trockenbeerenauslese.

The Wachau designations include:

Steinfeder
The lightest wines which may be spritzig or lightly sparkling. Literally "stone feather". Under the Austrian Klosterneuburger Mostwaage scale for measuring must weight, grapes harvested for Steinfeder wines must achieve at least 15–17°KMW, not be subjected to chaptalization during production and finish with an alcohol level no greater than 11.5%. The symbol for this class is the stipa pennata or feather grass that is commonly found planted on Wachau hillsides.

Federspiel
Made from riper grapes harvested at least 17°KMW and producing wines with an alcohol level between 11.5–12.5%. Literally "feather game", also a surname (see Federspiel). Like the other classification, the wines can not be chaptalized. The maximum residual sugar for these wines is 4 g/L. The symbol for this classification is a falcon which pays homage to the historical pastime of falconry in the Wachau.

Smaragd
The ripest wines that must contain at least 12.5% APV. Literally "emerald" (see Smaragd). The maximum residual sugar level for these wines is 9 g/L. This designation was first used in 1986, right after the diethylene glycol scandal, and was intended to denote the highest quality level of Wachau wines. All grapes destined for this designation must attain at least 18.5°KMW and all finished wine must be sealed with a long natural cork that is at least 49mm long and branded with vintage year. From 2007, screwcaps are also allowed. The wines have to be aged in bottle and not released till after May 1 following harvest though some producers will age their inventory longer. Smaragd wines tend to be the most sought after and critically acclaimed Wachau wines with well made examples from favorable vintages having the potential to age for more than 20 years. The symbol for this class is an emerald lizard that can found sunning itself on the stone terraces along the Danube.

Like other Austrian wines, wines from the Wachau are usually labeled by varietal with the grape variety listed needing to constitute at least 85% of the grape variety. Similarly, at least 85% of the grapes from a given harvest must come from the a vintage year on the label.

== Vinea Wachau ==
The Vinea Wachau is an organization of Wachau producers who united in 1983 to create a trade association that will not only promote Wachau wines worldwide but also protect the image and integrity of the Wachau wine region. Using the historical seal of Leuthold I von Kuenring (1243–1313), a local Ministerialengeschlecht or knight of the powerful Kuenringer family, the organization outlined the Vinea Wachau Nobilis Districtus or "heart of Wachau" which included the wine villages where traditionally the best Wachau wine was produced. Today the organization includes more than 200 members, who collectively own more than 85% of the vineyard land in the Wachau.

Members of the Vinea Wachau not only must follow Austria's strict wine laws but also abide by the association's own standards. The wines designated as Steinfeder, Federspiel and Smaragd cannot be chaptalized or back-sweetened with süssreserve. All wine submitted by members are tasted by a panel for quality assurances with samples of every wine, from every vintage stored at a facility at Spitz so it is available for comparison should any quality control issues emerge.
