= Federspiel =

Federspiel is a Germanic surname that literally means "feather play". The name originates in Switzerland. Notable people with the surname include:

- Ben Federspiel (born 1981), Luxembourgish footballer
- Birgitte Federspiel (1925–2005), Danish actress
- Ejner Federspiel (1896–1981), Danish actor
- Fred Federspiel (born 1963), American entrepreneur and nuclear physicist
- Frederikke Federspiel (1839–1913), Danish photographer
- Joe Federspiel (born 1950), American football player
- Jürg Federspiel (1931–2007), Swiss writer
- Per Federspiel (1905–1994), Danish politician

== Other uses ==
- Federspiel (wine), a wine classification term in the Austrian region of Wachau
