= Kremser =

Kremser is a surname. Notable people with the surname include:

- Friedrich Kremser (born 1942), Austrian retired footballer
- Karl Kremser (born 1945), American football placekicker
- Manfred Kremser (1950–2013), Austrian ethnologist
- Thomas Kremser, poker professional

== See also ==
- Kremser SC, Austrian football club
