= Spitz, Austria =

Town in Lower Austria, Austria

Spitz
- Municipality
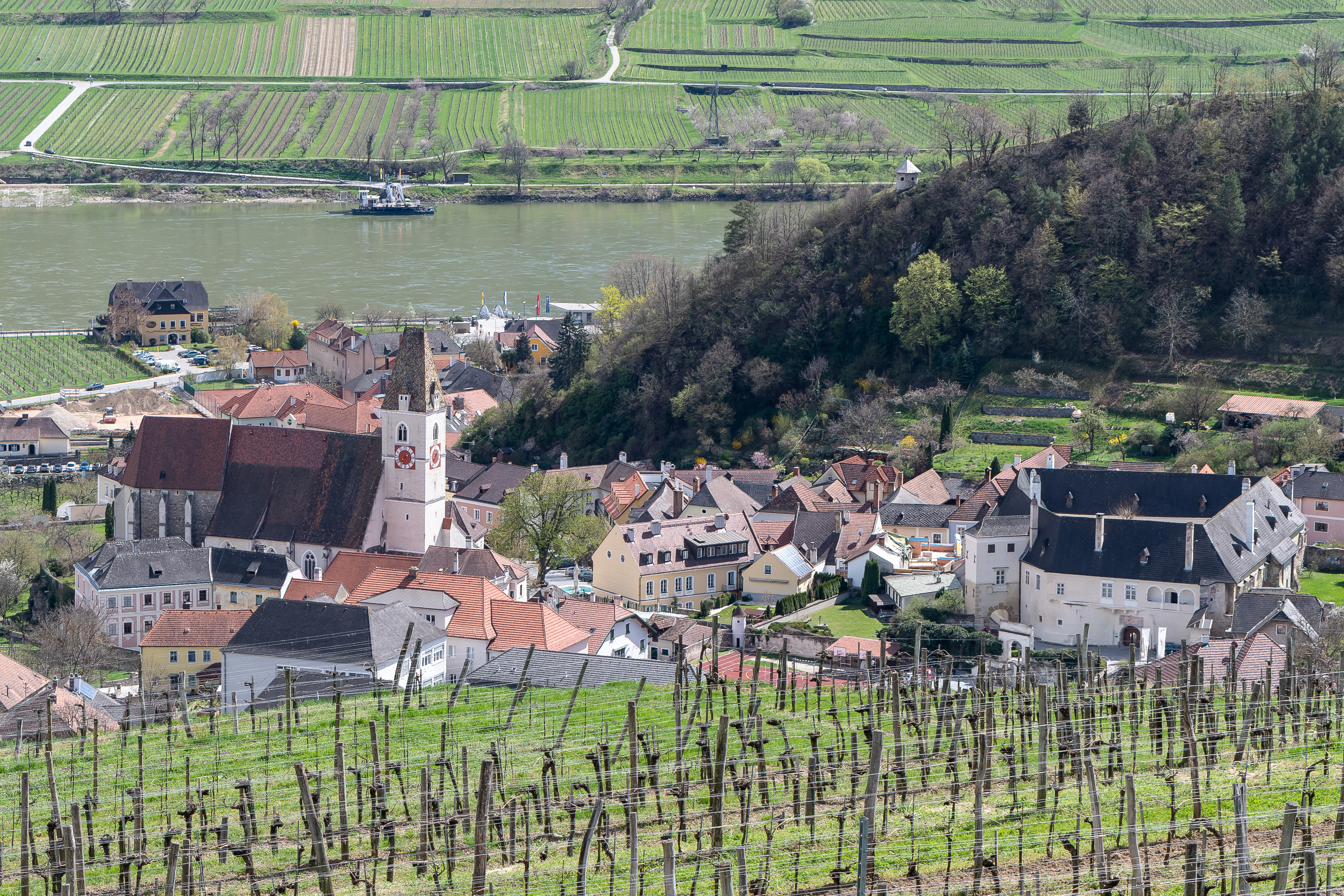

- Coat of arms

- Location within Austria
- Coordinates: 48°21′N 15°25′E
- Country: Austria
- State: Lower Austria
- District: Krems-Land

Government
  - Mayor: Andreas Nunzer (ÖVP) website = www.spitz-wachau.at

Area
  - Total: 23.82 km^{2} (9.20 sq mi)
- Elevation: 223 m (732 ft)

Population (2018-01-01)
  - Total: 1,620
  - Density: 68.0/km^{2} (176/sq mi)
- Time zone: UTC+1 (CET)
  - Summer (DST): UTC+2 (CEST)
- Postal code: 3620
- Area code: 02713

Spitz an der Donau is a market town in the district of Krems-Land in the Austrian state of Lower Austria, in the midst of the UNESCO World Heritage area Wachau, further down from Willendorf on the left bank of the Danube. The ferry across the Danube here is interesting in that it has no motor or sail: it is powered by rudder set against the river current, anchored to a cable above the river. The ferry carries passengers, bicycles, motorcycles, and automobiles.

== History ==
Occupied since Celtic times, it was first mentioned in 830. A hill "Tausendeimerberg" (the "Hill of a Thousand Buckets") is so named because of the many grapes that grow there, for the Wachau valley, for which Spitz is in, is famous for them. The Late Gothic church to St. Maurice is famous for its Apostles (1380) and an altarpiece by Kremser Schmidt. To the south of Spitz is the famous fortress of Hinterhaus.

In February 2008, Spitz made an appearance in domestic news following the poisoning of then–mayor Dr. Hannes Hirtzberger.

== Population ==
Historical population
Year	Pop.	±%
1971	2,134	—
1981	2,025	−5.1%
1991	1,931	−4.6%
2001	1,769	−8.4%
2017	1,627	−8.0%

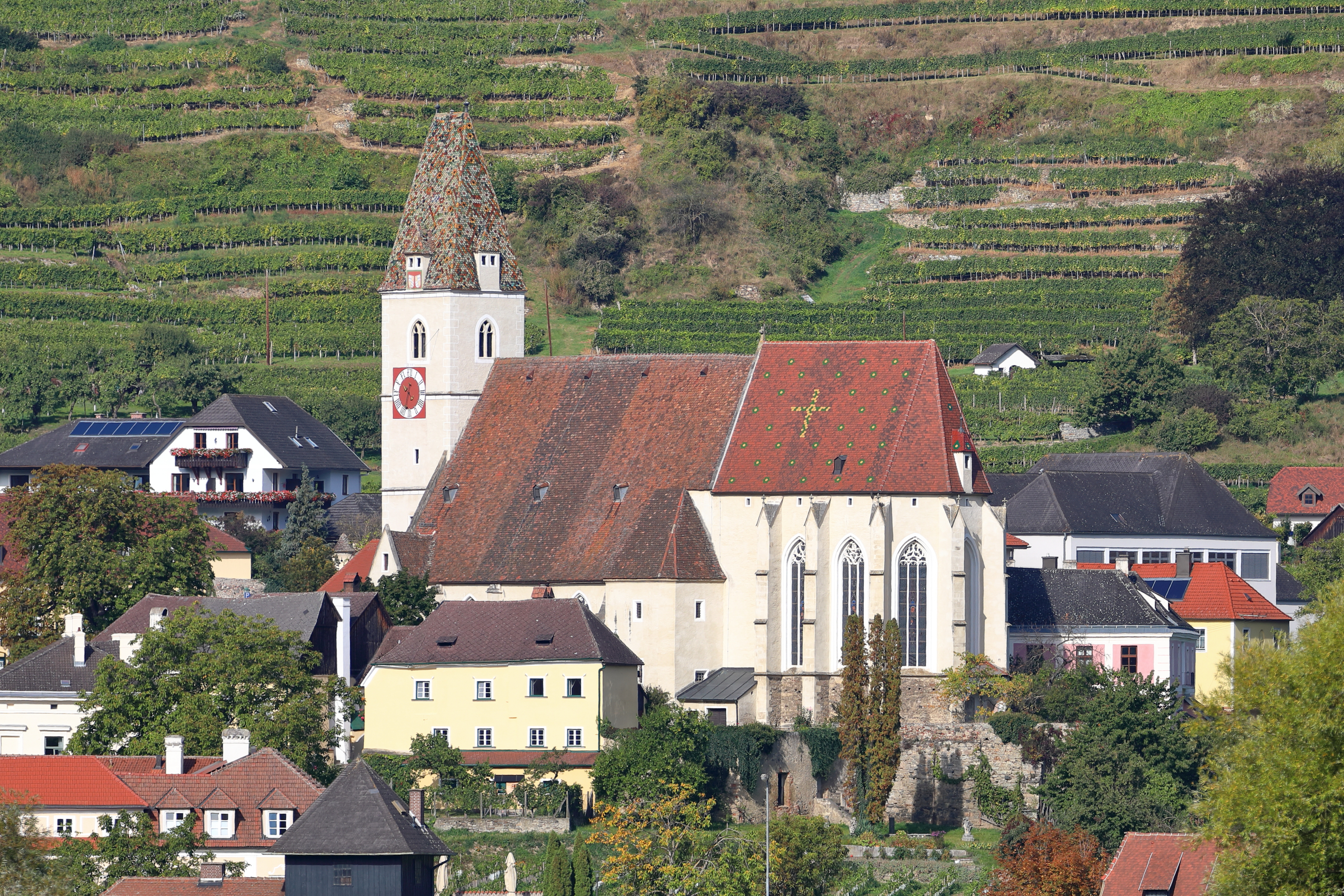
Parish church of Spitz

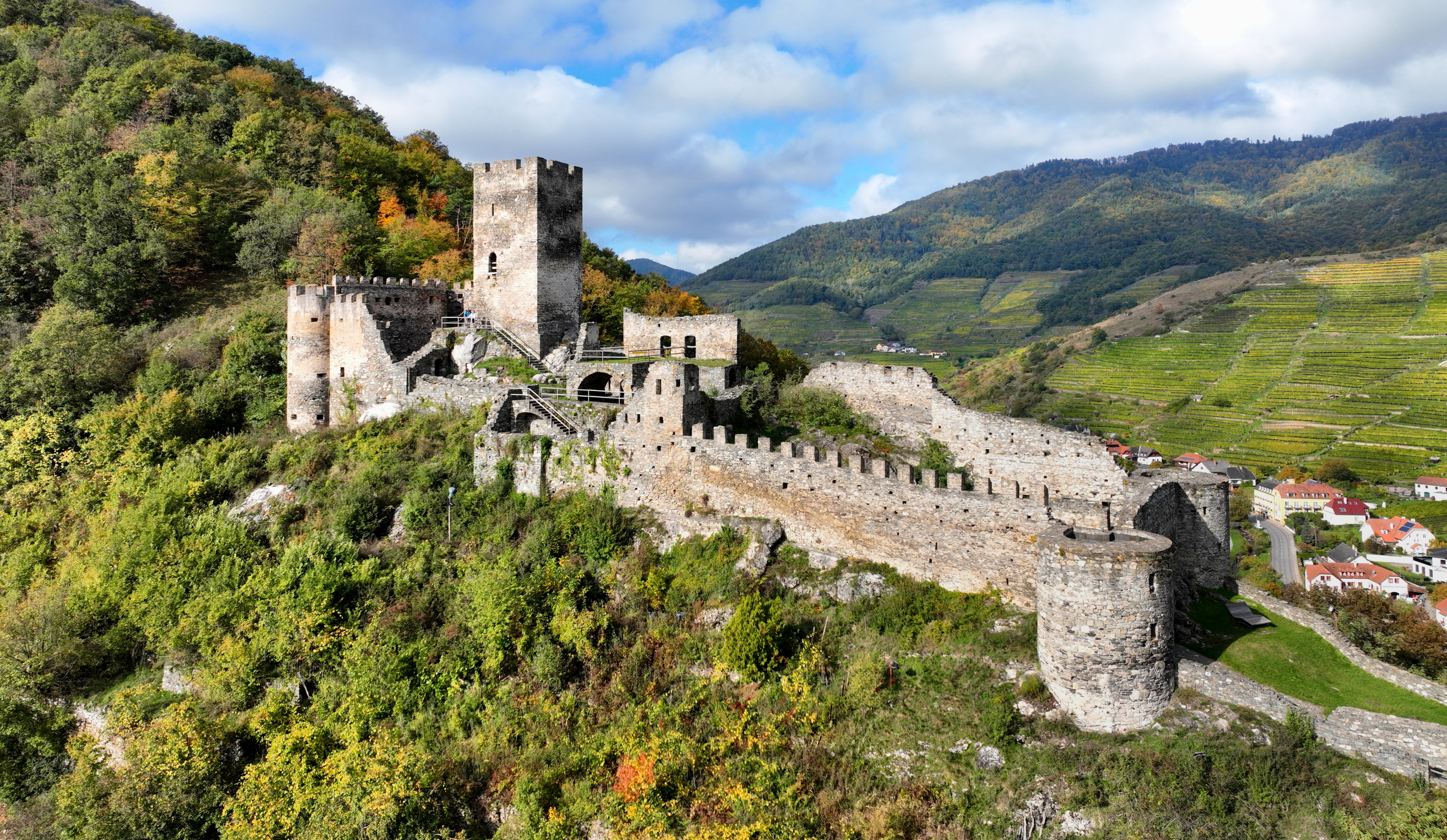
Hinterhaus ruins in Spitz

== Geography ==
Spitz lies on the left bank of the Danube in the Waldviertel in Lower Austria. The area of the market town covers 23.83 square kilometers. 69.21 percent of the area is forested. In Spitz, the Spitzer stream flows into the Danube

== Partner City ==
Since 2006, Spitz and "Taufkirchen an der Pram", located in the Upper Austrian district of Schärding, have been partner communities. Meetings and visits in all areas of daily life contribute to the strengthening of the partnership.
