= Weißenkirchen in der Wachau =

- Municipality
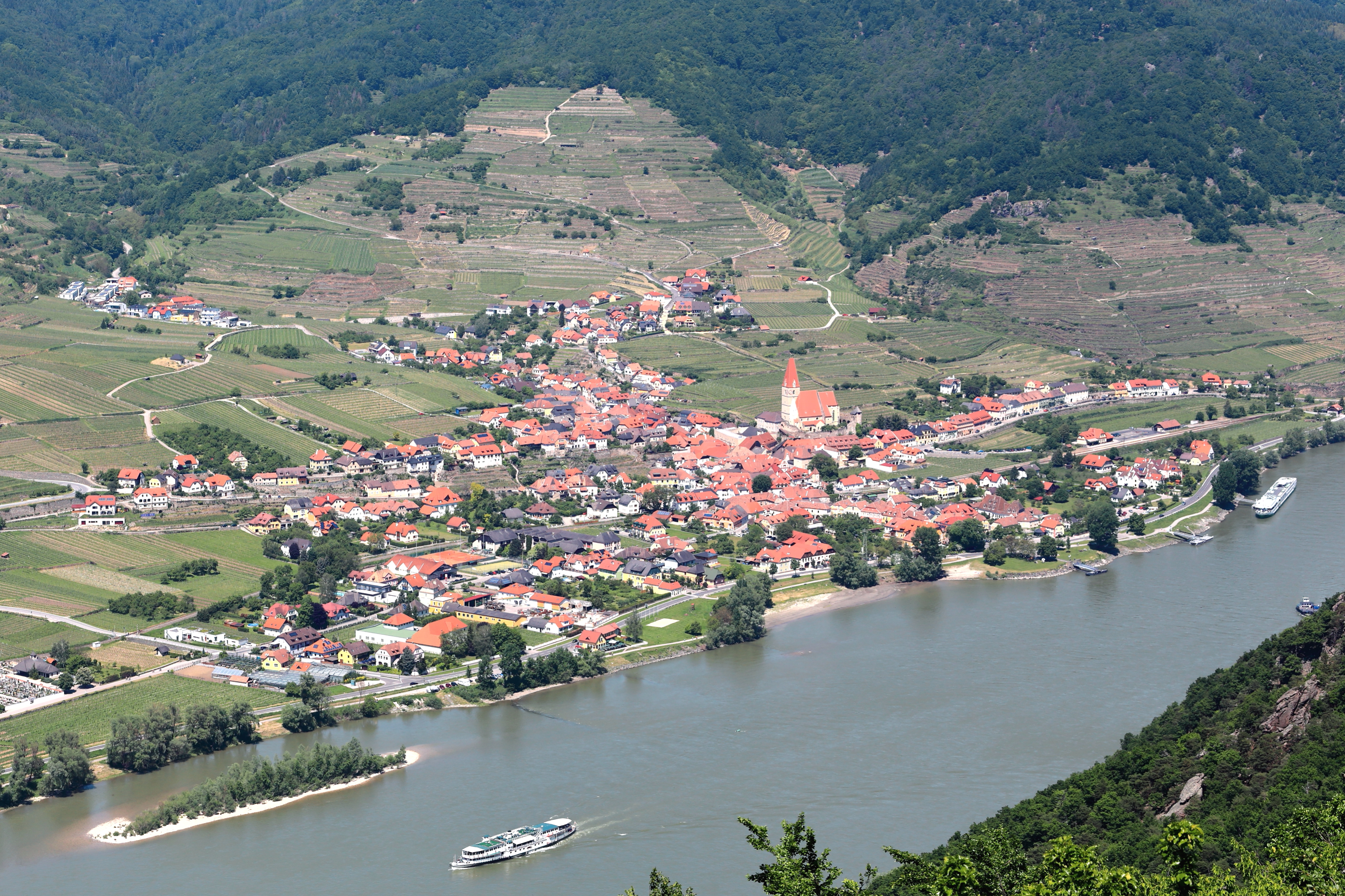

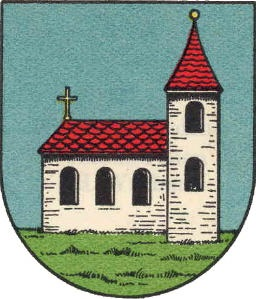
- Coat of arms

- Location within Austria
- Coordinates: 48°24′N 15°28′E
- Country: Austria
- State: Lower Austria
- District: Krems-Land

Government
  - Mayor: Anton Bodenstein

Area
  - Total: 23.29 km^{2} (8.99 sq mi)
- Elevation: 224 m (735 ft)

Population (2018-01-01)
  - Total: 1,429
  - Density: 61.36/km^{2} (158.9/sq mi)
- Time zone: UTC+1 (CET)
  - Summer (DST): UTC+2 (CEST)
- Postal code: 3610
- Area code: 02715
- Website: www.weissenkirchen-wachau.at

Weißenkirchen in der Wachau is a town in the district of Krems-Land in the Austrian state of Lower Austria. The ferry across the Danube here is interesting in that it has no motor or sail: it is powered by rudder set against the river current, anchored to a cable above the river. The ferry carries passengers, bicycles, motorcycles, and automobiles.

== Population ==
Historical population
| Year | Pop. | ±% |
|---|---|---|
| 1971 | 1,672 | — |
| 1981 | 1,601 | −4.2% |
| 1991 | 1,563 | −2.4% |
| 2001 | 1,494 | −4.4% |

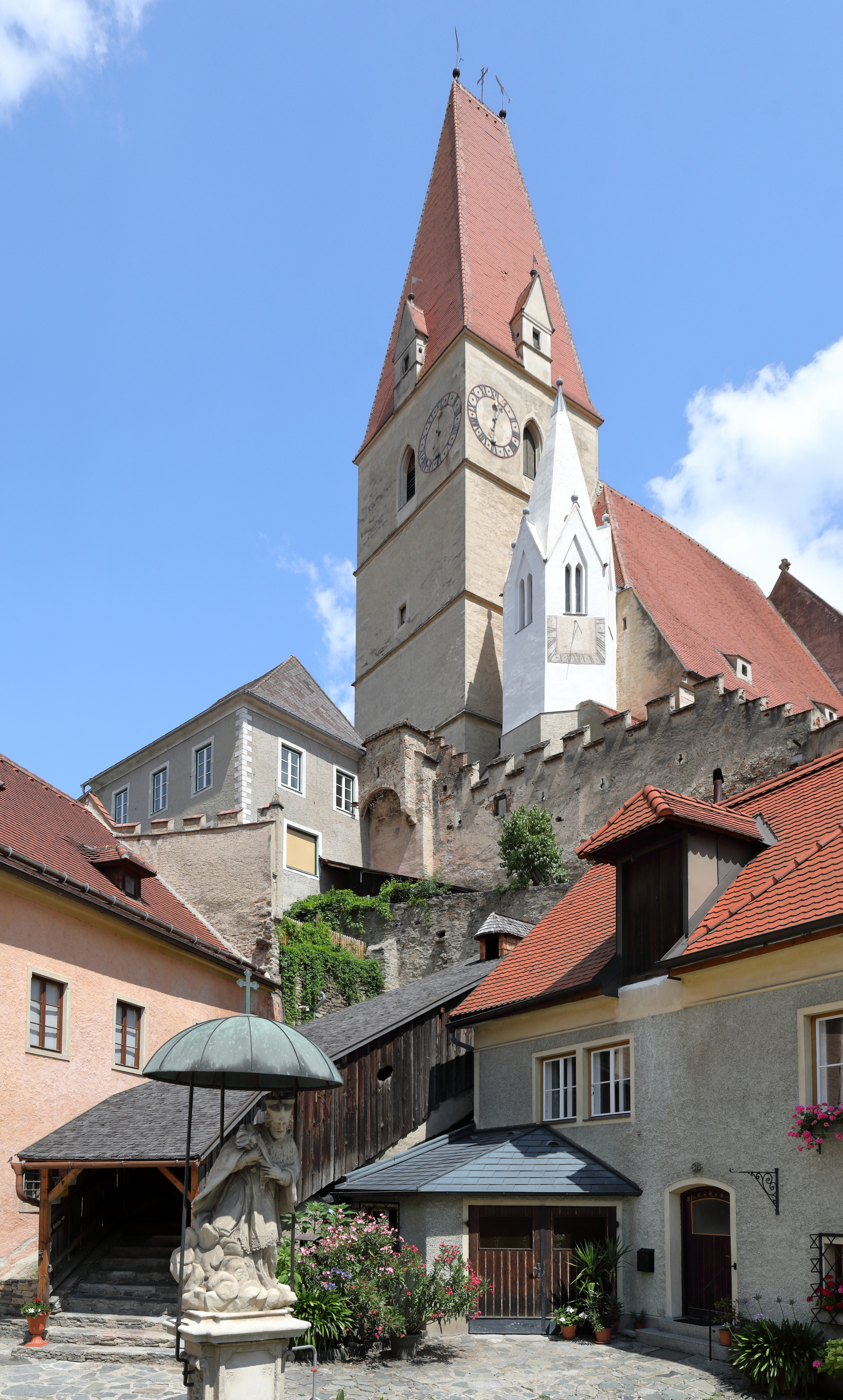
View from the market square to the parish church

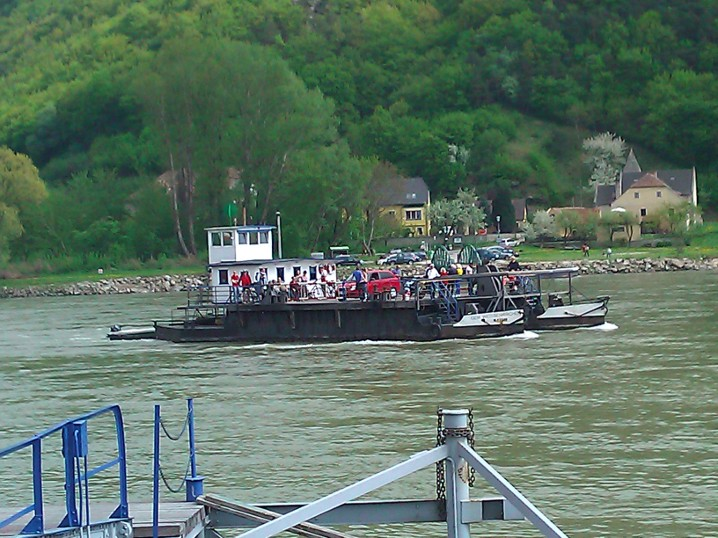
Ferry between Weißenkirchen and St. Lorenz before mooring at Weißenkirchen

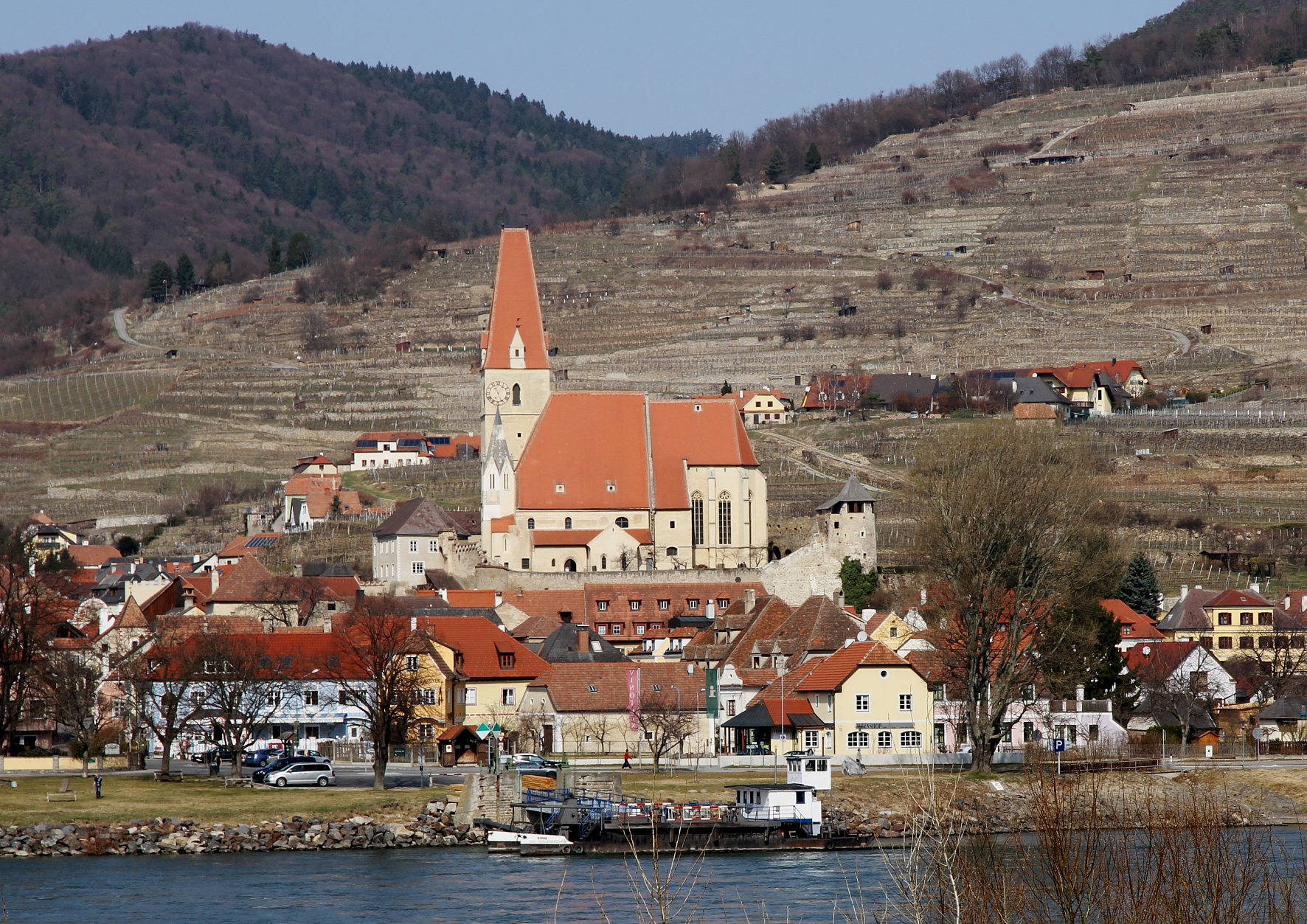
Parish church of Weißenkirchen
