= Mautern an der Donau =

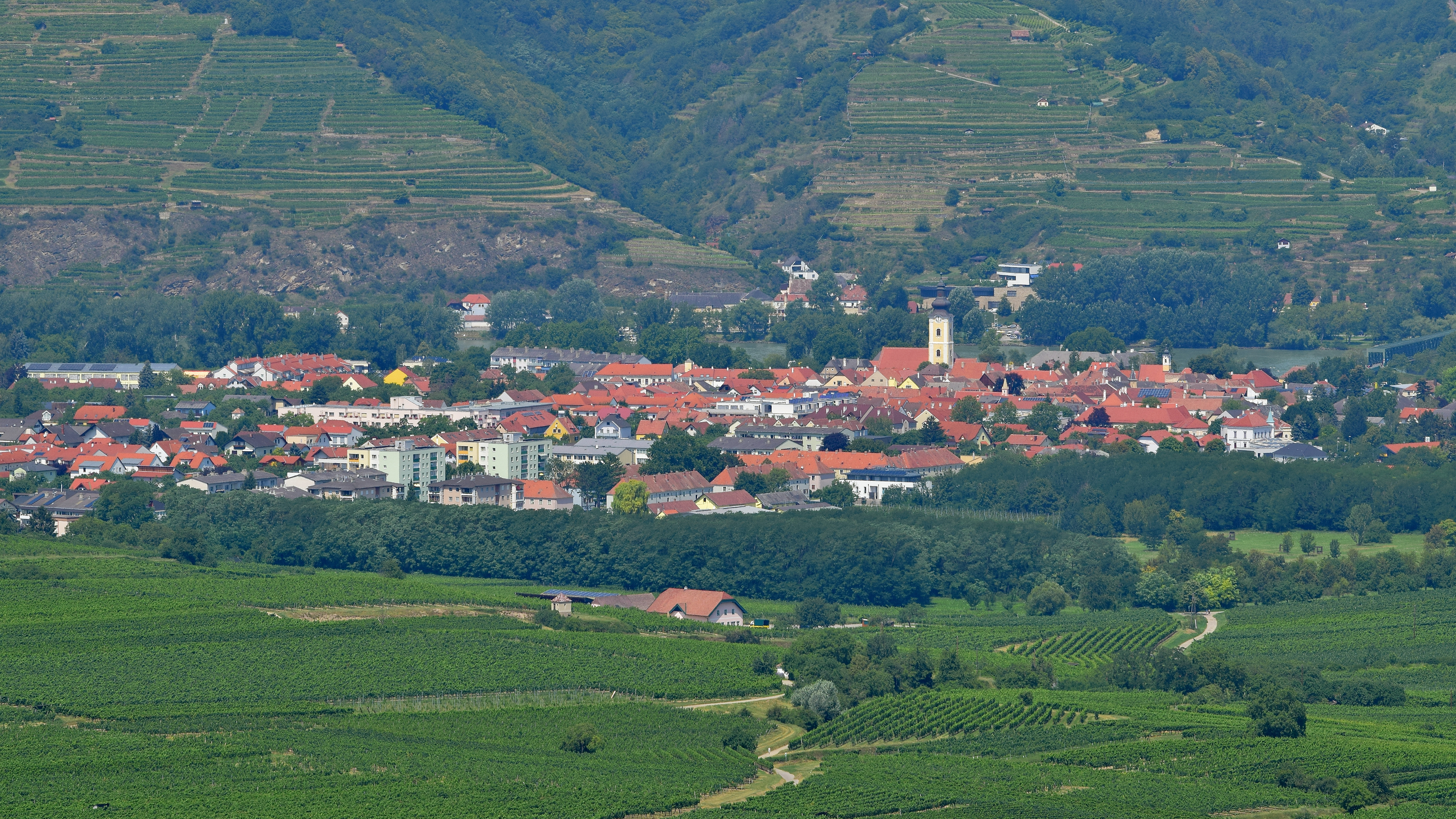
- General view

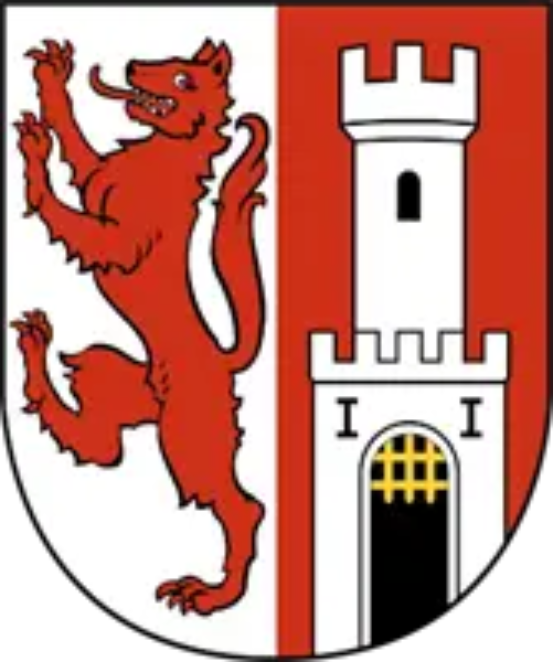
- Coat of arms

- Location within Austria
- Coordinates: 48°23′39.498″N 15°34′36.519″E
- Country: Austria
- State: Lower Austria
- District: Krems-Land

Government
  - Mayor: Heinrich Brustbauer (ÖVP)

Area
  - Total: 9.15 km^{2} (3.53 sq mi)
- Elevation: 336 m (1,102 ft)

Population (2018-01-01)
  - Total: 3,567
  - Density: 390/km^{2} (1,010/sq mi)
- Time zone: UTC+1 (CET)
  - Summer (DST): UTC+2 (CEST)
- Postal code: 3512
- Area code: 02732
- Website: www.mautern.at

Mautern an der Donau is a town in the district of Krems-Land in the Austrian state of Lower Austria.

== Geography ==
It is situated on the southern bank of the Danube opposite Krems.

== History ==
In former times ships cruising the Danube had to pay a toll when they passed Mautern. The town got its name from there because toll translates as "Maut" in German.

Before it got this name it was called Favianae by the Romans because it was a very important fort.

Being an important merchant point in the Middle Ages, it gained additional importance as the bridge over the Danube River was built (a steelwork as of 1895).

== Population ==
Historical population
Year	Pop.	±%
1869	1,413	—
1880	1,428	+1.1%
1890	1,493	+4.6%
1900	1,650	+10.5%
1910	1,728	+4.7%
1923	1,643	−4.9%
1934	1,887	+14.9%
1939	1,762	−6.6%
1951	2,118	+20.2%
1961	2,232	+5.4%
1971	2,590	+16.0%
1981	2,883	+11.3%
1991	3,037	+5.3%
2001	3,074	+1.2%
2011	3,469	+12.8%
2021	3,482	+0.4%

== Notable peoplle ==
- Anton Kerner von Marilaun (1831–1898), botanist and physician, was born in Mautern an der Donau.

== Places of interest ==
A museum dedicated to the Roman Empire times, when Castell Faviani was in place of today's town centre. Also a part of the Roman wall (Römerwand) can be found here.

The Roman Catholic parish church of St. Stephanus is now of baroque appearance, but the Christian faith has its roots in times of Saint Severinus of Noricum, who died here and organised some refugee retreats in the area for people driven from their homes by Huns.

The cycle path Donauradweg leg 6 comes to the town along the right bank and crosses the Danube river. The highway bridge has also a pedestrian pathway offering interesting river views and is a steel work of interest per se.

== Twin towns ==
Mautern an der Donau is twinned with:

- Mautern in Steiermark, Austria

== Gallery ==
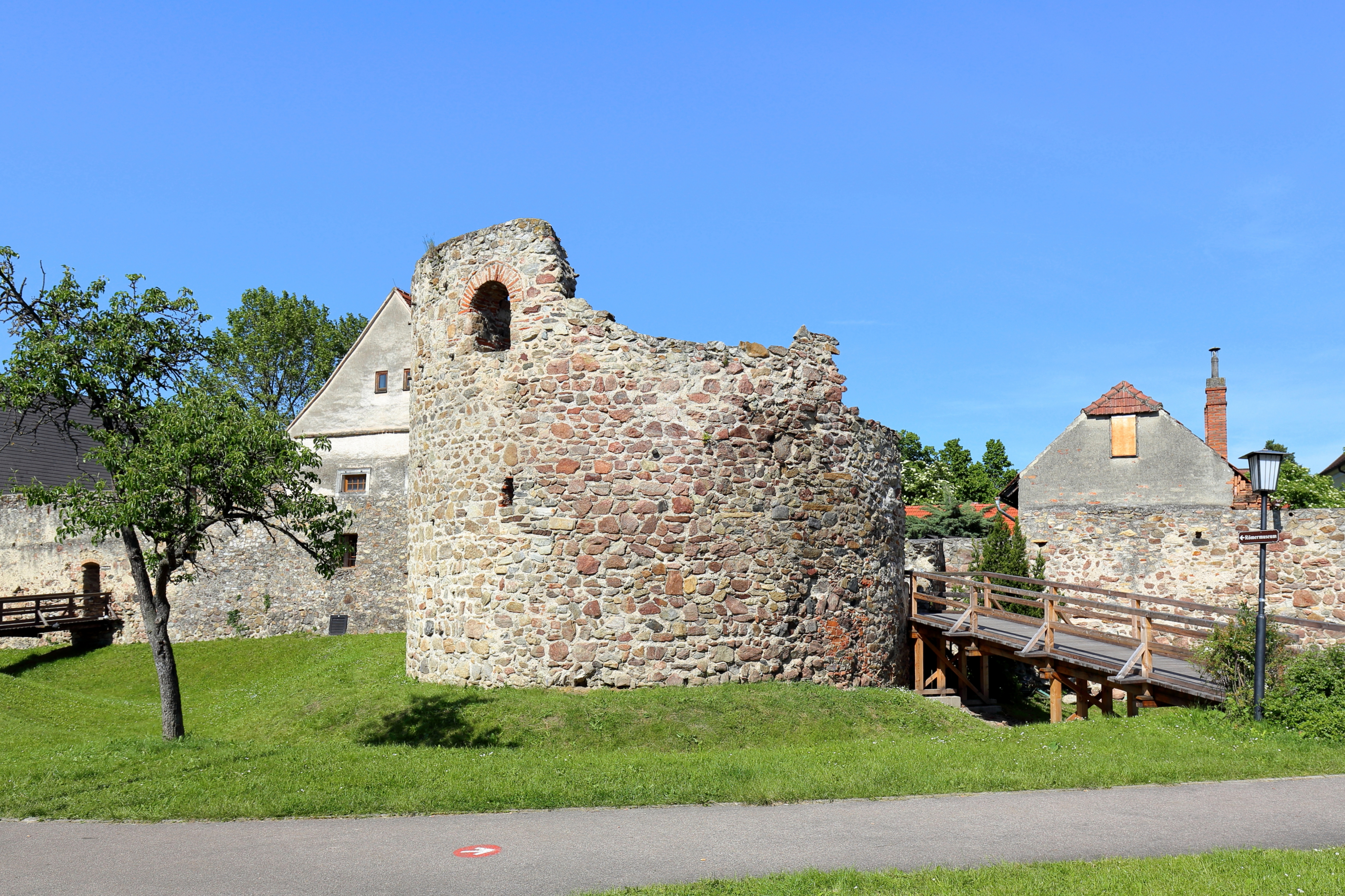
Ruins of the Kastell Favianis in Mautern a.d. Donau
