= Willendorf =

Willendorf may refer to:

- Willendorf an der Schneebergbahn, Austria
- Willendorf in der Wachau, Austria
  - Venus of Willendorf a Paleolithic figurine found in Willendorf in der Wachau
- Willendorf, a fictional place in the game Blood Omen: Legacy of Kain
