= Barbara Steiner =

Austrian art historian and curator (b. 1964)

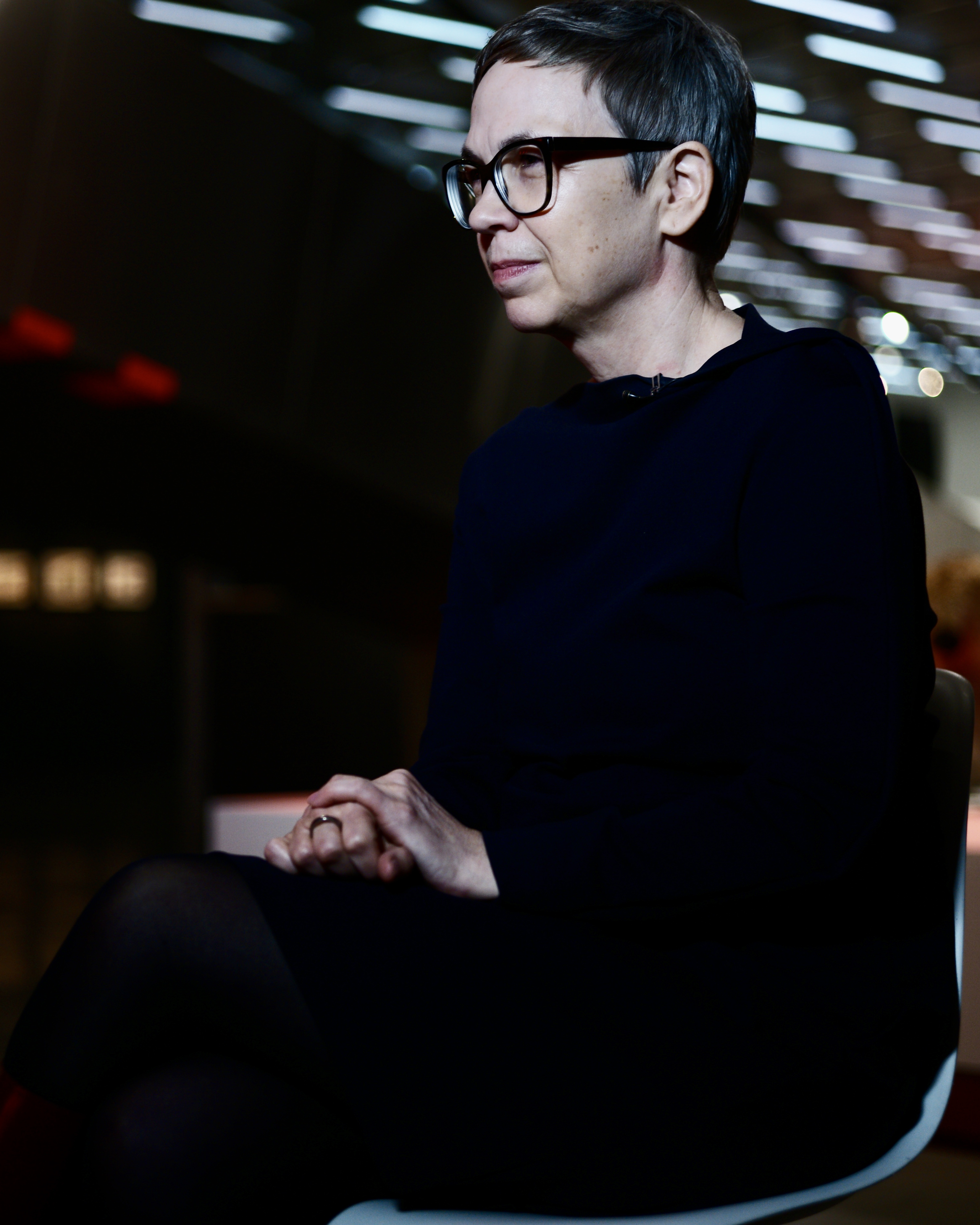
- Steiner in 2019
- Born: 1964 (age 61–62); Dörfles, Austria
- Education: University of Vienna

Barbara Steiner (born 1964) is an Austrian art historian, curator, author, and editor. Steiner is the director of the Bauhaus Dessau Foundation. She served as the director of the Galerie für Zeitgenössische Kunst Leipzig from 2001 to 2011, and as the director of Kunsthaus Graz from 2016 to 2021.

== Biography ==
Steiner was born in Dörfles, Austria, in 1964. She graduated from the Ortwein School in Graz in 1984, studied art history at the University of Vienna, and undertook post-graduate research in museum and curatorial studies at the State Academy for Lower Austria in Krems.

== Career ==
Steiner began her curatorial career in Germany and Austria in the 1990s. She wrote the first text on the artist Erwin Wurm in 1990. Steiner organized the exhibition Backstage: Topology of Contemporary Art at Kunstverein Hamburg with Stephan Schmidt-Wulffen in 1993, and curated Lost Paradise at Kunstraum Vienna in 1994, exhibiting works by Jeremy Deller, Liam Gillick, Jorge Pardo, Philippe Parreno, and Rirkrit Tiravanija. Lost Paradise was revisited for its importance in an exhibition and publication titled theanyspacewhatever at the Guggenheim in 2008. In the late 1990s, Steiner headed art associations in Ludwigsburg and Wolfsburg, working with artists such as Angela Bulloch, Ólafur Elíasson, Liam Gillick, Karen Kilimnik, and Philippe Parreno.

Steiner served as the director of the Leipzig Museum of Contemporary Art (GfZK) from 2001 to 2011. She modernized the museum's role as a cultural institution, and improved the former East German city's standing in the international art scene. Steiner exhibited both emerging and established artists such as Jun Yang and Deimantas Narkevičius, as well as Rosemarie Trockel, Sarah Morris, Ólafur Elíasson, Jorge Pardo, and Neo Rauch.

Steiner's most controversial program during her tenure at GfZK was Carte Blanche (2008–2010). She invited eleven companies, private collectors, and commercial galleries to curate and fund their own exhibitions at the museum, sparking a debate over the competing influences of private interest and public trust in contemporary art.

In 2012, Steiner took over as the artistic director of Europe (to the power of) n, a transnational project in collaboration with the Goethe-Institut, which produced exhibitions in multiple cities in Western Europe, Eastern Europe, China, and Taiwan. Steiner organized the exhibition Friends and Accomplices at Vienna Künstlerhaus (2014) and the Austrian Association of Women Artists (2015).

In 2016, Steiner was named director of Kunsthaus Graz, where she invited collaborations with artists, designers, and collectives such as Niels Jonkhans, Oliver Klimpel, Topotek 1, and Superflex. In 2018, Steiner co-curated the exhibition Congo Stars featuring 70 Congolese artists. Steiner exhibited Koki Tanaka in 2017, Jun Yang in 2019, and Haegue Yang in 2017 and 2020.

Since September 01, 2021, Steiner is director and CEO of the Bauhaus Dessau Foundation, Germany.

== Teaching ==
Steiner has taught at the University of Art and Design Linz (1994–2000), the Merz Akademie in Stuttgart (1999), the Braunschweig University of Art (1999–2000), and the Royal Danish Academy of Fine Arts (2000–2002, 2004–2005). From 2015 to 2017, she was professor for the Cultures of the Curatorial graduate program at The Academy of Fine Arts Leipzig (HGB).

== Exhibitions ==
=== Solo exhibitions ===
- 1997: Angela Bulloch, Sound Bank, Kunstverein Ludwigsburg
- 1997: Plamen Dejanov & Swetlana Heger, Plenty Objects of Desire, Kunstverein Ludwigsburg
- 1997: Liam Gillick, Discussion Island, Kunstverein Ludwigsburg
- 1997: Rirkrit Tiravanija, The History of the Struggle for the Window, Kunstverein Ludwigsburg
- 1998: Anita Leisz, The Last Events, Kunstverein Ludwigsburg
- 1998: Philippe Parreno, blue almost transparent, Kunstverein Ludwigsburg
- 1999: Karen Kilimnik, Kunstverein Wolfsburg
- 1999: Superflex, Kunstverein Wolfsburg
- 1999: Ólafur Elíasson, Kunstverein Wolfsburg
- 2000: Jun Yang, Kunstverein Wolfsburg
- 2000: Rirkrit Tiravanija, Kunstverein Wolfsburg
- 2000: Ólafur Elíasson, Kunstverein Wolfsburg
- 2001: Jun Yang, GfZK
- 2002: Christine Hill, Volksboutique Organizational Ventures, GfZK
- 2002: Johanna Kandl, GfZK
- 2003: Artur Żmijewski, Singing Lesson (with Julia Schäfer), GfZK
- 2003: Rirkrit Tiravanija, Social Pudding, GfZK
- 2003: Superflex, Counter-Strike, GfZK
- 2004: Deimantas Narkevičius, Energy Lithuania, GfZK
- 2005: Josef Dabernig, Dabernig Josef: Film, Foto, Text, Objekt, Bau, GfZK
- 2005: Via Lewandowsky, homezone, GfZK
- 2006: Anna Meyer, Internetionale, GfZK
- 2006: Atelier Le Balto, The Garden as a Form of Expression, GfZK
- 2007: Muntean & Rosenblum, GfZK
- 2011: Zak Kyes, Working With…, GfZK
- 2017: Koki Tanaka, Provisional Studies (Working Title), Kunsthaus Graz
- 2017–2018: Haegue Yang, VIP's Union, Kunsthaus Graz
- 2017–2021: Superflex, Five-Year Plan, Kunsthaus Graz
- 2019: Jun Yang, The Artist, the Work and the Exhibition, Kunsthaus Graz
- 2020: Herbert Brandl, Tomorrow, Kunsthaus Graz
- 2020–2021: Jun Yang, The Artist, his Collaborators, their Exhibition, and three Venues (with Huang Chien-Hung, Hsu Fong Ray, and Jun Yang), Kuandu Museum of Fine Arts, TKG+, and MOCA Taipei

=== Group exhibitions ===
- 1993: Backstage, Kunstverein Hamburg
- 1994: Lost Paradise, Kunstraum Wien
- 1998: Enter: Artist, Audience and Institution, Kunstmuseum Luzern
- 2002–2008: Shrinking Cities, Kunstwerke Berlin, GfZK
- 2006: Archit-Action, GfZK
- 2007–2009: Carte Blanche, GfZK
- 2011: Scenarios about Europe 1,2,3, GfZK
- 2012–2013: Europe (to the power of) n, London, Minsk, Łódź, Istanbul, Oslo, Novi Sad, Brussels, San Sebastián, Beijing, Taipei
- 2015: Collection Reversed: Transfer, Transformation and Ruptures, Museum of Modern and Contemporary Art Koroška
- 2016: Creative Infidelities, arc en rêve centre d'architecture, Bordeaux
- 2017: Up into the Unknown: Peter Cook, Colin Fournier and the Kunsthaus, Kunsthaus Graz
- 2018: Faith Love Hope, Kunsthaus Graz
- 2018–2019: Congo Stars, Kunsthaus Graz, Kunsthalle Tübingen
- 2019–2020: ARTS ⇆ CRAFTS Between Tradition, Discourse and Technologies, Kunsthaus Graz, GfZK, Kestner Gesellschaft

== Published works ==
- Eliasson, Olafur; Steiner, Barbara (1998). "Gegen die Zeit gehen". Kunst Bulletin (in German) (January/February).
- Hill, Christine (2004). Steiner, Barbara (ed.). The Work of Christine Hill and Volksboutique. Hatje Cantz. ISBN 978-3-7757-1278-1.
- Kyes, Zak (2012). Steiner, Barbara (ed.). Zak Kyes Working With…. New York: Sternberg. ISBN 978-1-934105-92-4.
- Pardo, Jorge (2000). Steiner, Barbara; Schafaff, Jörn (eds.). Jorge Pardo. Hatje Cantz. ISBN 978-3-7757-0847-0.
- Steiner, Barbara, ed. (2013). Superkilen. Arvinius + Orfeus Publishing. ISBN 978-9-18754-302-9.
- Steiner, Barbara; Yang, Jun (2004). Autobiography. Thames & Hudson. ISBN 978-0-50093-005-2.
- Superflex (2003). Spiegel, Andreas; Steiner, Barbrara; Esche, Charles (eds.). Tools. Cologne: Walther König.
- Yang, Haegue (2018). Steiner, Barbara (ed.). VIP's Union 2001-2018. Berlin: Bom Dia Boa Tarde Boa Noite. ISBN 978-3-943514-97-1.
- Yang, Jun (2020). Steiner, Barbara (ed.). TAHCTE&TV. Taipei: Aparallax. ISBN 978-986-99783-0-9.
- Yang, Jun (2015). Steiner, Barbara (ed.). The Monograph Project, Volume 1–3. Berlin: Jovis. ISBN 978-3-86859-366-2.
- Yang, Jun (2018). Steiner, Barbara (ed.). The Monograph Project, Volume 4–6. Berlin: Jovis. ISBN 978-3-86859-367-9.
