= Josef Szombathy =

Austro-Hungarian archaeologist (1853–1943)

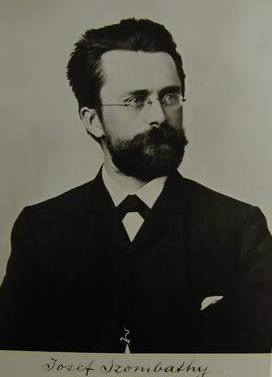

Josef Szombathy born Szombathy József (11 June 1853 – 9 November 1943) was an Austro-Hungarian archaeologist; he was present when the Venus of Willendorf was discovered in 1908.

The Venus of Willendorf is an 11.1-centimetre-high (4.4 in) statuette of a female figure, discovered at a Paleolithic site near Willendorf, a village in Lower Austria near the city of Krems. It is carved from an oolitic limestone that is not local to the area, and tinted with red ochre. It is estimated to have been carved c. 30,000 years ago.

As a result of this and other finds, he founded the Department of Prehistory at the Naturhistorisches Museum, Vienna in 1882. Szombathy collected finds from all over the Austro-Hungarian empire, including Galicia, Bukovina, Bohemia, Moravia, Carniola, and Vojvodina.

Josef Szombathy died of natural causes in 1943.

== Bibliography ==
- "Die Aurignacienschichten in Löss von Willendorf," Korrespondenzblatt der Deutschen Gesellschaft für Anthropologie, Ethnologie, und Urgeschichte, XL (1909), 85-88
