= Jun Yang (artist) =

Artist (b. 1975)

- 楊俊
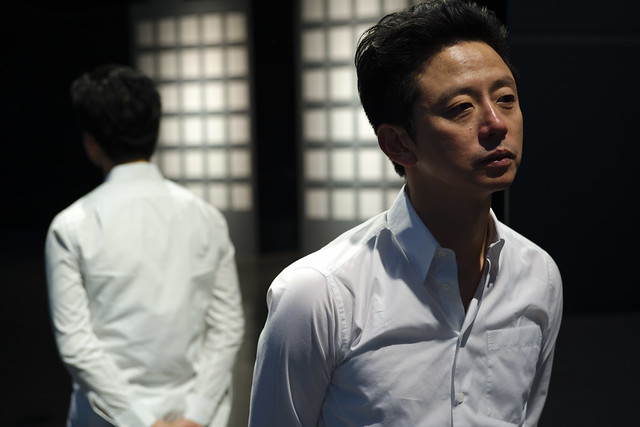
- Yang at Kunsthaus Graz, 2019
- Born: 1975 (age 50–51); Qingtian, China
- Education: Gerrit Rietveld Academie, Amsterdam, Netherlands; Akademie der bildenden Künste Wien, Vienna, Austria
- Awards: Otto Mauer Art Award 2005; Prize for Visual Arts of the City of Vienna 2017
- Website: junyang.info

Jun Yang (born 1975) (Chinese: 杨俊) is a Chinese-Austrian contemporary artist who lives and works in Vienna, Taipei, and Yokohama.

== Biography ==
Jun Yang was born in 1975, in Qingtian, China. When he was four years old, his family immigrated to Europe, intending to reach Belgium but instead settling in Vienna, Austria. Although his mother and father were not professional chefs, they found work in a Chinese restaurant, and later went into the restaurant business for themselves. Yang was continually aware of his outsider status while growing up, first as an immigrant in Austria, then as an Austrian in Europe, and later as a foreign passport-holder in China. The varying cultural contexts in which Yang was born and raised became sources of inspiration for his artistic projects, which focus on issues of identity, biography, social change, language, and authenticity.

Yang received his higher education at the Gerrit Rietveld Academie in Amsterdam, and at the Academy of Fine Arts Vienna, where he studied under Michelangelo Pistoletto.

== Career ==
Jun Yang's work includes video, film, sculpture, installations, performance art, and interior and public space design. Beginning in 1997, Yang undertook a series of performance pieces titled As I Saw in Vienna, Cahors (1999), Paris (2000), Wolfsburg (2000), Leipzig (2001), and Stockholm (2002). For each performance he chose an image from a local newspaper and recreated it out of newsprint in a gallery space. He also shot a series of photo booth performances including As I Saw (Photo booth) (1997) and from salariiman to superman (1997).

From 1999 to 2000, Yang was an artist-in-residence at the MAK Center for Art and Architecture in Los Angeles, where he used video and installation art to explore the aesthetics of Chinese restaurants and Chinatowns from Hollywood films, as well as his own family's history of emigration and restaurant ownership. After 2001, he opened a number of restaurants in Vienna, including ra'mien and ra'mien go, which he considered to be a continuation of his art and design work, rather than purely commercial ventures.

Works such as Soldier Woods (2002), Mail for... (2006), and Jun Yang meets Jun Yang (2015) dealt with questions of language, naming, and identity. Yang branched out into film-making with A Short-Story on Forgetting and Remembering (2007), Norwegian Woods (2008), Seoul Fiction (2010), and The Age of Guilt and Forgiveness (2016). Works such as Paris Syndrome (2007) addressed issues of desire and alienation in modern exurban China and elsewhere. Many of his projects incorporate architecture and space design, such as GfZK Garden (2006), Cafe Paris Syndrome (2007), Hotel Paris Syndrome (2011), and a proposal for a public space - a cinema (2012). In 2017, he designed The Café Leopold at Leopold Museum in Vienna.

Yang has participated in numerous international biennials, including Manifesta 2012, Venice 2005, Liverpool 2006, Taipei 2008, Gwangju 2012 and 2018, Bangkok 2018, and Sydney 2018. In 2009, Yang co-founded the Taipei Contemporary Art Center.

Yang published the first three volumes of The Monograph Project in 2015, and the second three volumes in 2018. The project covered 18 years of the artist's work, and was completed with two principle collaborators, the curator Barbara Steiner and the designer Oliver Klimpel.

In 2018, Art Sonje Center in Seoul held a solo exhibition for Yang, titled The Overview Perspective. In January 2019, Yang participated in a panel discussion at the Museum of Applied Arts, Vienna with Ai Weiwei, Uli Sigg, and Ying Miao. In February 2019, Kunsthaus Graz opened a major retrospective of Yang's work, titled The Artist, the Work, and the Exhibition, which also included work by Mike Kelley, Paul McCarthy, Bruce Yonemoto, Koki Tanaka, siren eun young jung, Lee Kit, and others.

Yang is a member of Vienna Secession, and was elected to its board in 2021. He is represented by Vitamin Creative Space (Guangzhou), ShugoArts (Tokyo), and Galerie Janda (Vienna).
