= Haegue Yang =

South Korean artist (born 1971)

- 양혜규
- Born: December 12, 1971 (age 54); Seoul, South Korea
- Education: Seoul National University, Städelschule
- Occupation: Artist
- Known for: Sculpture, installation

Korean name
- Hangul: 양혜규
- Hanja: 梁慧圭
- RR: Yang Hyegyu
- MR: Yang Hyegyu
- Website: www.heikejung.de

Haegue Yang (Korean: 양혜규; born December 12, 1971) is a South Korean artist primarily working in sculpture and installation. After receiving her B.F.A from Seoul National University in 1994, Yang received an M.A. from Städelschule where she now teaches as a professor of Fine Arts. She currently lives and works in Berlin and Seoul.

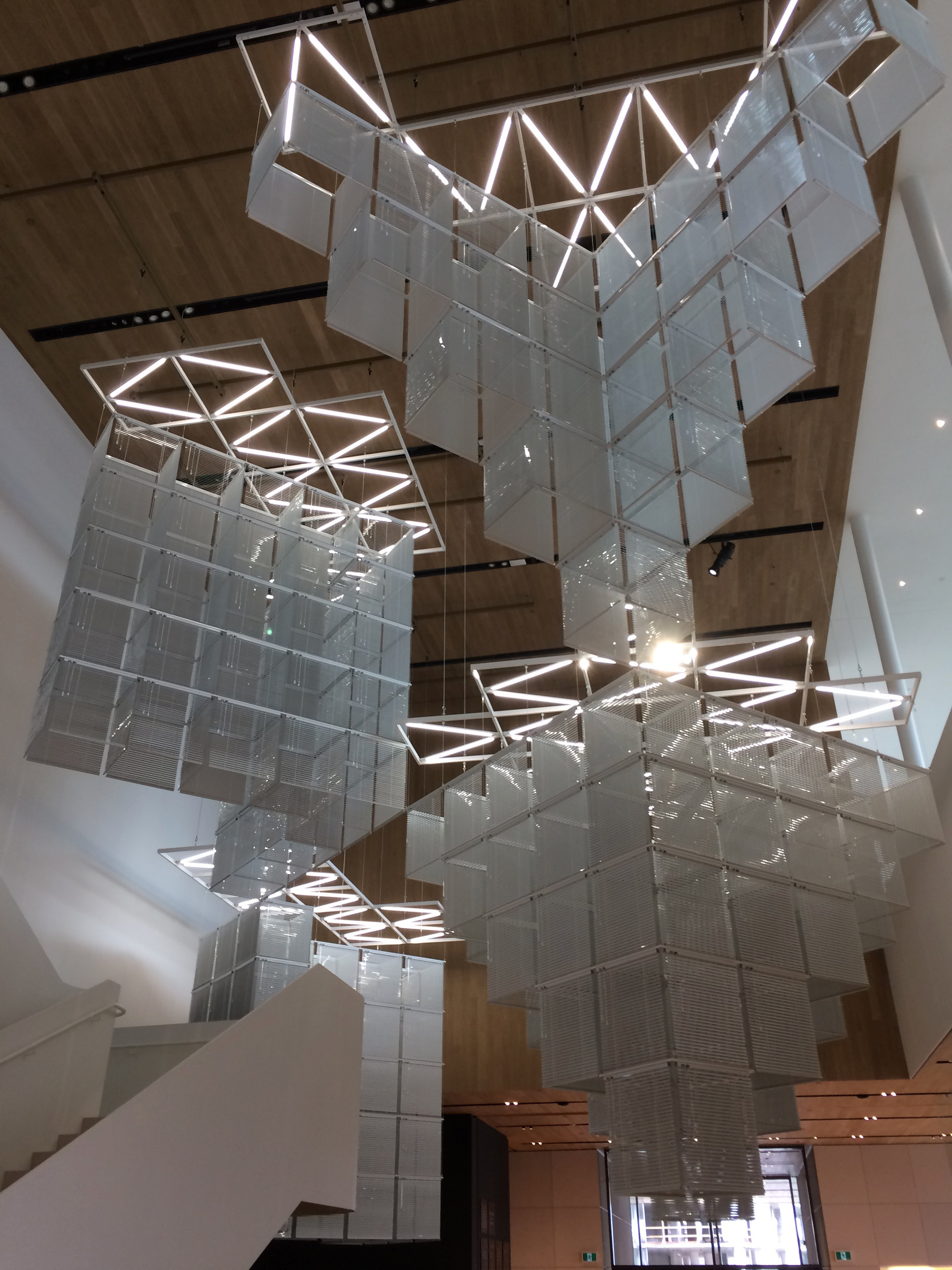
Haegue Yang, Four Times Sol LeWitt UpsideDown, Version Point to Point, 2016–2017. Remai Modern, Saskatoon.

With the statement “I believe that out of the alienation one can mobilize the unusual strength to sympathize with the others,” Yang seeks to embrace vulnerability, thus exploring themes that may include “individual and national identity, displacement, isolation, and community,” while also avoiding “tying herself to one [identity] based on gender, race or geography.” By using disparate household objects, including yarn, light fixtures, and fans, into alternative configurations, Yang explores meanings for these objects outside of their typical functional uses. Some of her installations incorporate venetian blinds that filter the light in the gallery, and segment the space, creating multiple viewpoints. Some installation incorporate bells, moving theater lights, and scent diffusers to engage multiple senses of the viewer's perception. She also creates mural-like graphic wall pieces, that function as dramatic, immersive scenery. Yang draws from a array of references, including her own biography, historical events, film, and literature, to create installations like Sadong 30 (2006) and performances like The Malady of Death (2010-ongoing). Some interior works include moving sculptures such as Dress Vehicles (2012), as well as outdoor works like Migratory DMZ Birds on Asymmetric Lens (2020). Overall, she considers her work as a "communicative way of sharing life," by allowing viewers to "imagine events with others."

In 2018 a catalogue raisonné of over 1,400 works was published in conjunction with her solo show "ETA" at Museum Ludwig. In the same year she received the Republic of Korea Cultural and Art Award (Presidential Citation). Her work is included in the collections of the National Museum of Modern and Contemporary Art in South Korea, Museum of Modern Art, and Museum Ludwig.

== Early life and education ==
Yang was born in South Korea in 1971. Her father, Hansoo Yang (born 1945, Seoul), is a journalist and her mother, Misoon Kim (born 1945, Incheon), is a writer. Hansoo Yang worked for an international construction company after he was dismissed from his job at the Dong-A Ilbo along with 160 colleagues for protesting censorship under Park Chung-hee's regime. Both Hansoo Yang and Misoon Kim were active in the Minjung Movement.

Haegue Yang received her Bachelor of Fine Arts (B.F.A.) in 1994 from Seoul National University in Korea with a focus on sculpture. In 1995, she moved to Germany to study with artist Georg Herold at Städelschule. She was an exchange student at Cooper Union in New York City from 1996 to 1997. She graduated in 1999 with her Master's (Meisterschüler). In 2002 she benefited from an artist residency at Cité internationale des arts in Paris.

== Career ==
After receiving her B.F.A., Yang moved to Germany. Her first solo exhibition was held in 2000 at Barbara Wien gallery in Berlin. Initial difficulties selling and storing Yang's work led to Yang's installation work Storage Piece (2004)–a pile of crates filled with Yang's work on top of shipping pallets.

Yang is based in Berlin and Seoul. She has been a professor of Fine Arts at the Städelschule since 2017. She works in sculpture, installation, collage, photography, video, and performance from her studio in Kreutzberg. Curator and art critic Nicholas Bourriaud considers her work as sculptural means to deal with the presence of the body in space.

Her sculptures often feature household objects and mundane materials such as racks, lightbulbs, yarn, electrical cables, and Venetian blinds. She sometimes pairs these objects with sensorial components, such as steam from a humidifier, temperature changes using a heater and air conditioner, and diffused smells, for example in her "Series of Vulnerable Arrangements" (2006-8).

Yang’s style could be defined “between minimalism and conceptualism” that creates “a kind of modernist paradox.” Ideally, her work provides an “anachronistic lens…to view present conditions” and “revise our understanding of modernist abstraction.” Therefore, while Yang states that her work is influenced by the conceptual art from the 1960s and 70s, she also believes that conceptual art needs to be re-defined in relation to contemporary art now. Yang also believes that, abstraction does not negate the possibility for narrative in her work, but instead "allows a narrative to be achieved without constituting its own limits." Art historian Joan Kee states that Yang's interest in formalism "is marked by a sustained attention to morphology, to structure."

Yang believes sculptures like Sallim (shown at the 53rd Venice Biennale in 2009) addressed feminism and issues around gender in references to housework, which can have multiple meanings that can extend into religion, immigration, and class. She has at times pushed against the critical emphasis on her diasporic status in interpretations of her practice. In thinking about the relationship between aesthetics and politics, Yang cites Felix Gonzalez-Torres, (who Yang has shown with) she states "I say the best thing about aesthetics is that the politics which permeate it are totally invisible."

=== Selected exhibitions ===
- Dynamic Spaces, 2025 Galerie für Zeitgenössische Kunst Leipzig, Germany
- Moved by Schlemmer, 2022, Kunstmuseum Stuttgart, Germany
- Haegue Yang: Emergence, 2020, Art Gallery of Ontario, Toronto, Canada
- MMCA Hyundai Motor Series 2020: Haegue Yang - O₂ & H₂O, 2020, National Museum of Modern and Contemporary Art, South Korea
- Uncharted Territory, 2016, Hamburger Kunsthalle, Germany
- Sol LeWitt Upside Down – Open Modular Cubes (Small), Expanded 958 Times, 2016, Queensland Art Gallery, Brisbane, Australia
- Haegue Yang: Four Times Sol LeWitt UpsideDown, Version Point to Point, 2016, Remai Modern, Saskatoon, Canada
- An Opaque Wind Park in Six Folds, 2016, Serralves Foundation, Contemporary Art Museum, Porto, Portugal
- Shooting the Elephant 象 Thinking the Elephant, 2015, Leeum, Samsung Museum of Art, Seoul, South Korea

== Collections ==
- Bristol's Museums, Galleries & Archives, Bristol, UK
- Carnegie Museum of Art, Pittsburgh, USA
- Los Angeles County Museum of Art, Los Angeles, USA
- Museum of Modern Art, New York, USA
- M+, Hong Kong, China
- SeMA, Seoul Museum of Art, Seoul, South Korea
- Solomon R. Guggenheim Museum, New York, USA
- Tate Collection, London, UK
- The Museum of Fine Arts, Houston, USA
- Walker Art Center, Minneapolis, USA
