= Willendorf an der Schneebergbahn =

Willendorf
- Municipality
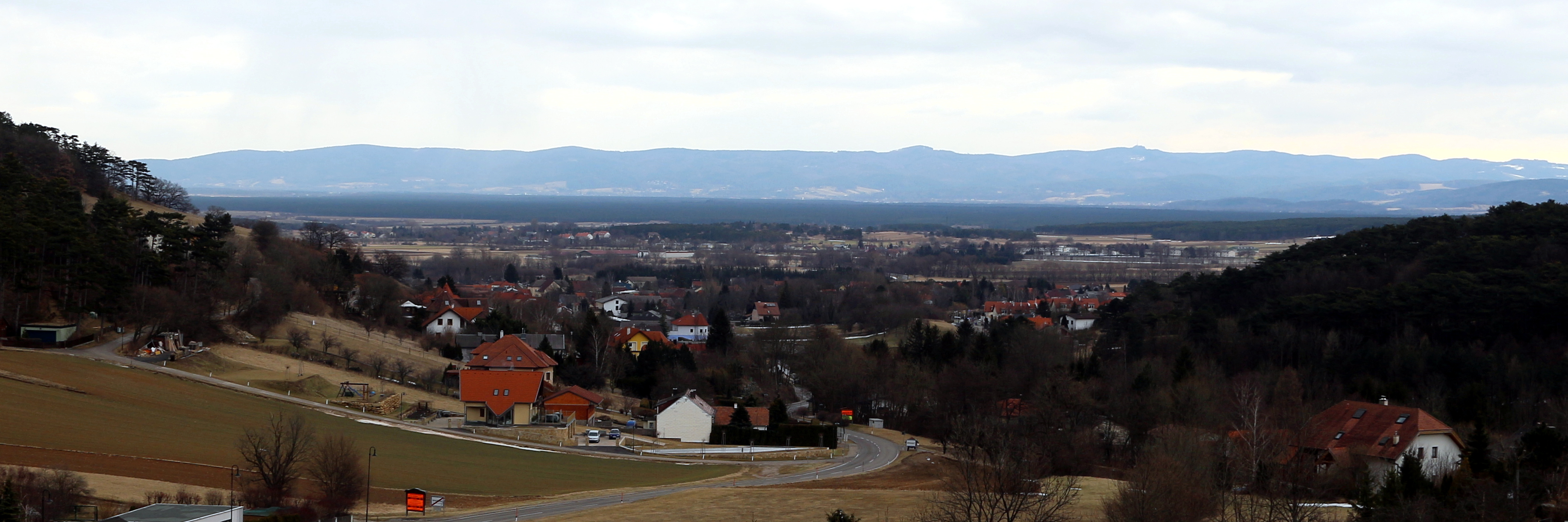
- View of Willendorf

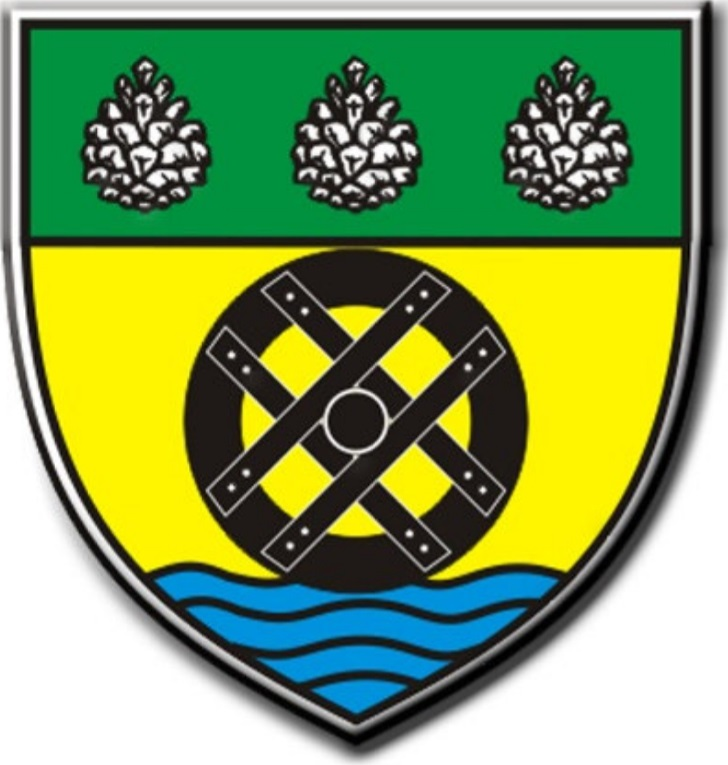
- Coat of arms

- Location within Austria
- Coordinates: 47°47′N 16°3′E
- Country: Austria
- State: Lower Austria
- District: Neunkirchen

Government
  - Mayor: Ing. Johannes Bauer

Area
  - Total: 7.32 km^{2} (2.83 sq mi)
- Elevation: 389 m (1,276 ft)

Population (2018-01-01)
  - Total: 971
  - Density: 133/km^{2} (344/sq mi)
- Time zone: UTC+1 (CET)
  - Summer (DST): UTC+2 (CEST)
- Postal code: 2732
- Area code: 02620
- Website: www.willendorf.at

Willendorf an der Schneebergbahn (German, 'Willendorf on the Schneeberg Railway') is a town in the district of Neunkirchen in the Austrian state of Lower Austria. It is not to be confused with Willendorf in der Wachau where the Venus of Willendorf was discovered.

== Population ==
Historical population
Year	Pop.	±%
1869	453	—
1880	525	+15.9%
1890	615	+17.1%
1900	644	+4.7%
1910	615	−4.5%
1923	809	+31.5%
1934	705	−12.9%
1939	661	−6.2%
1951	667	+0.9%
1961	680	+1.9%
1971	705	+3.7%
1981	671	−4.8%
1991	727	+8.3%
2001	798	+9.8%
2011	897	+12.4%
