= Aggsbach =

- Municipality
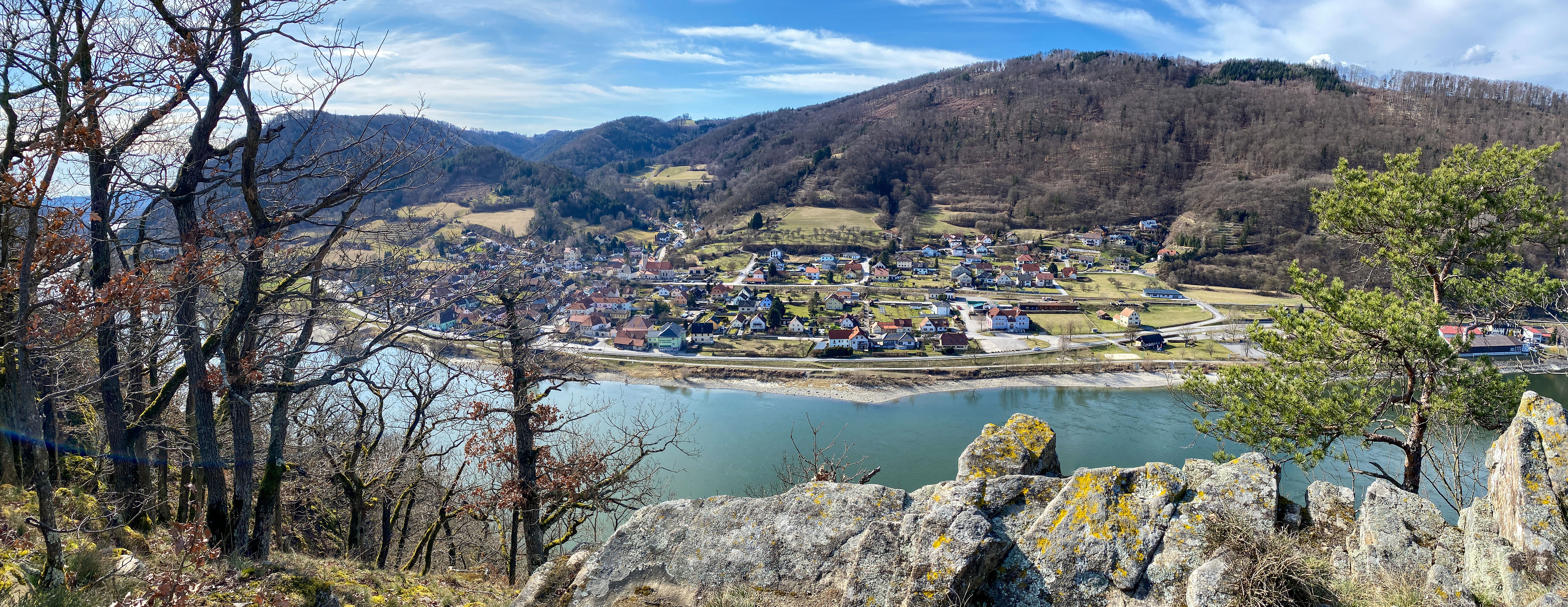
- Aggsbach Markt as seen from the opposite bank of the Danube

- Coat of arms

- Location within Austria Aggsbach (Lower Austria)
- Coordinates: 48°17′N 15°24′E
- Country: Austria
- State: Lower Austria
- District: Krems-Land

Government
  - Mayor: Rainer Toifl (ÖVP)

Area
  - Total: 13.72 km^{2} (5.30 sq mi)
- Elevation: 214 m (702 ft)

Population (2018-01-01)
  - Total: 643
  - Density: 46.9/km^{2} (121/sq mi)
- Time zone: UTC+1 (CET)
  - Summer (DST): UTC+2 (CEST)
- Postal code: 3641, 3643
- Area code: 02712
- Website: https://www.aggsbach.gv.at/

Aggsbach (in 1961-1972 Aggsbach Markt) is a small wine-growing town in the Krems-Land district of Lower Austria, Austria. As of 2001, it has a population of 714 and an area of 13.72 square kilometres (5.30 sq mi). Aggsbach was first mentioned in an 1148 document calling it "Accusabah".

== Population ==
Historical population
Year	Pop.	±%
1971	710	—
1981	711	+0.1%
1991	735	+3.4%
2001	719	−2.2%
2011	689	−4.2%
2021	643	−6.7%

== Venus von Willendorf ==
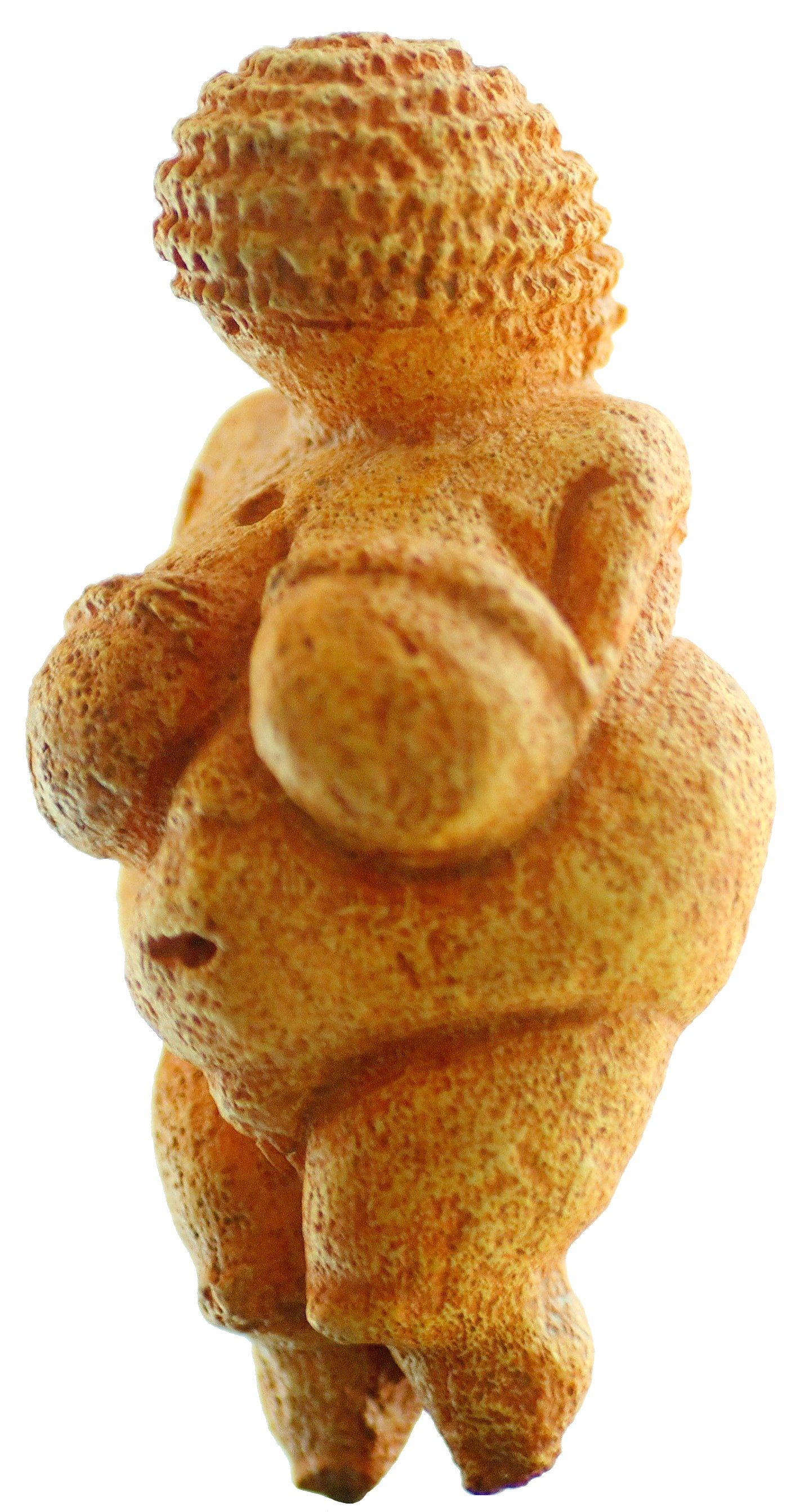
Today Aggsbach is most famous for being the place where the Venus of Willendorf was found, in the Willendorf hamlet.

Today Aggsbach is most famous for being the place where the Venus of Willendorf was found, in the Willendorf hamlet. The actual female fertility figure is located in the Naturhistorisches Museum in Vienna, while a life size reproduction is located in a field in Willendorf. The other hamlets are Aggsbach Markt (the main town), Groisbach, and Köfering.
