= Galerie für Zeitgenössische Kunst Leipzig =

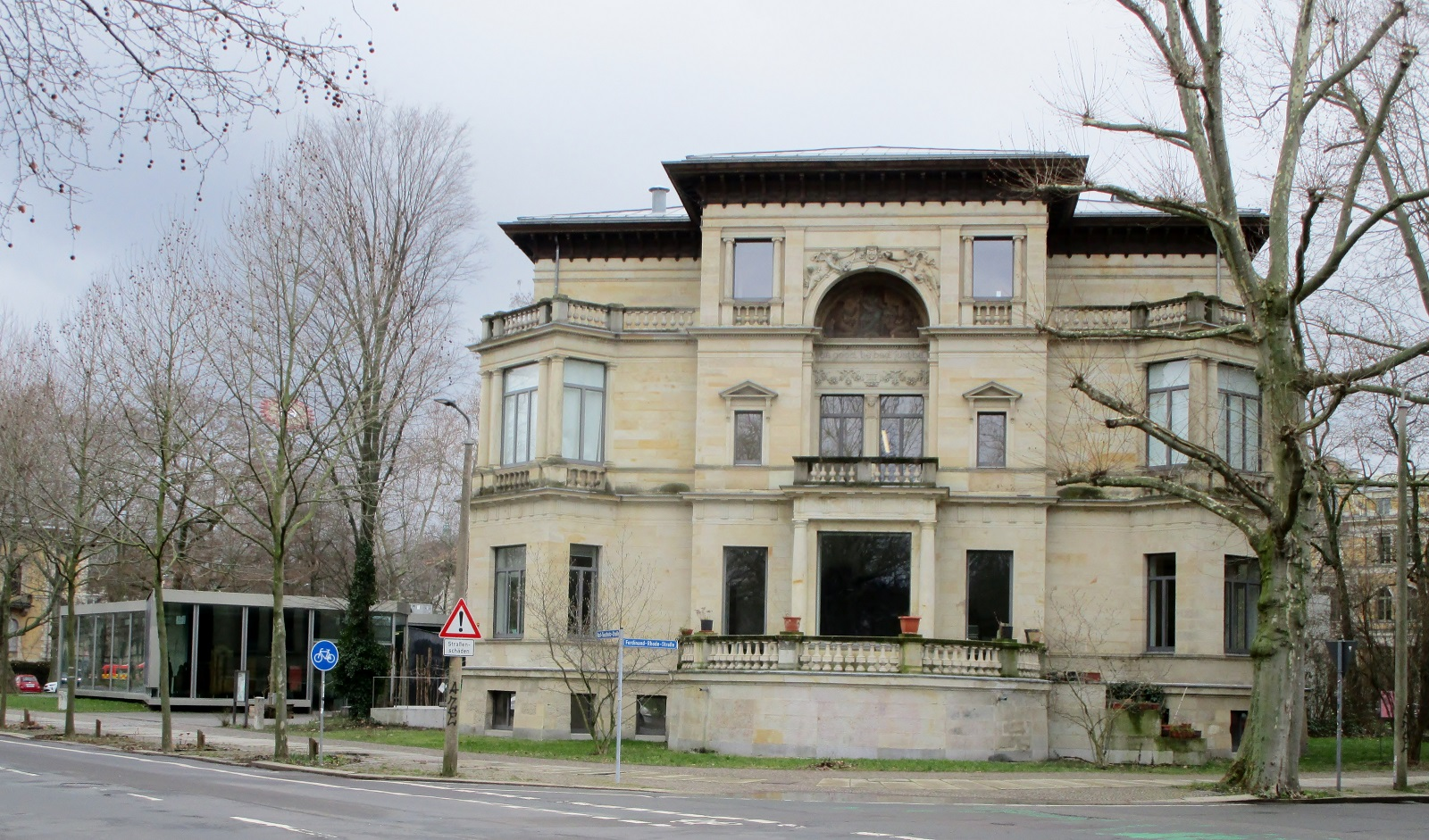
- Herfurth Villa, to the left of it the modern exhibition hall (2024)
- Established: 1998
- Location: Leipzig, Germany
- Coordinates: 51°20′02″N 12°21′55″E
- Type: Art museum
- Visitors: 107,540 (2022)
- Director: Franciska Zólyom
- Public transit access: Leipzig trams, tram stop Neues Rathaus (New Town Hall), line 2 and 9, and bus stop Wächterstrasse (line 89)
- Website: https://gfzk.de/en/

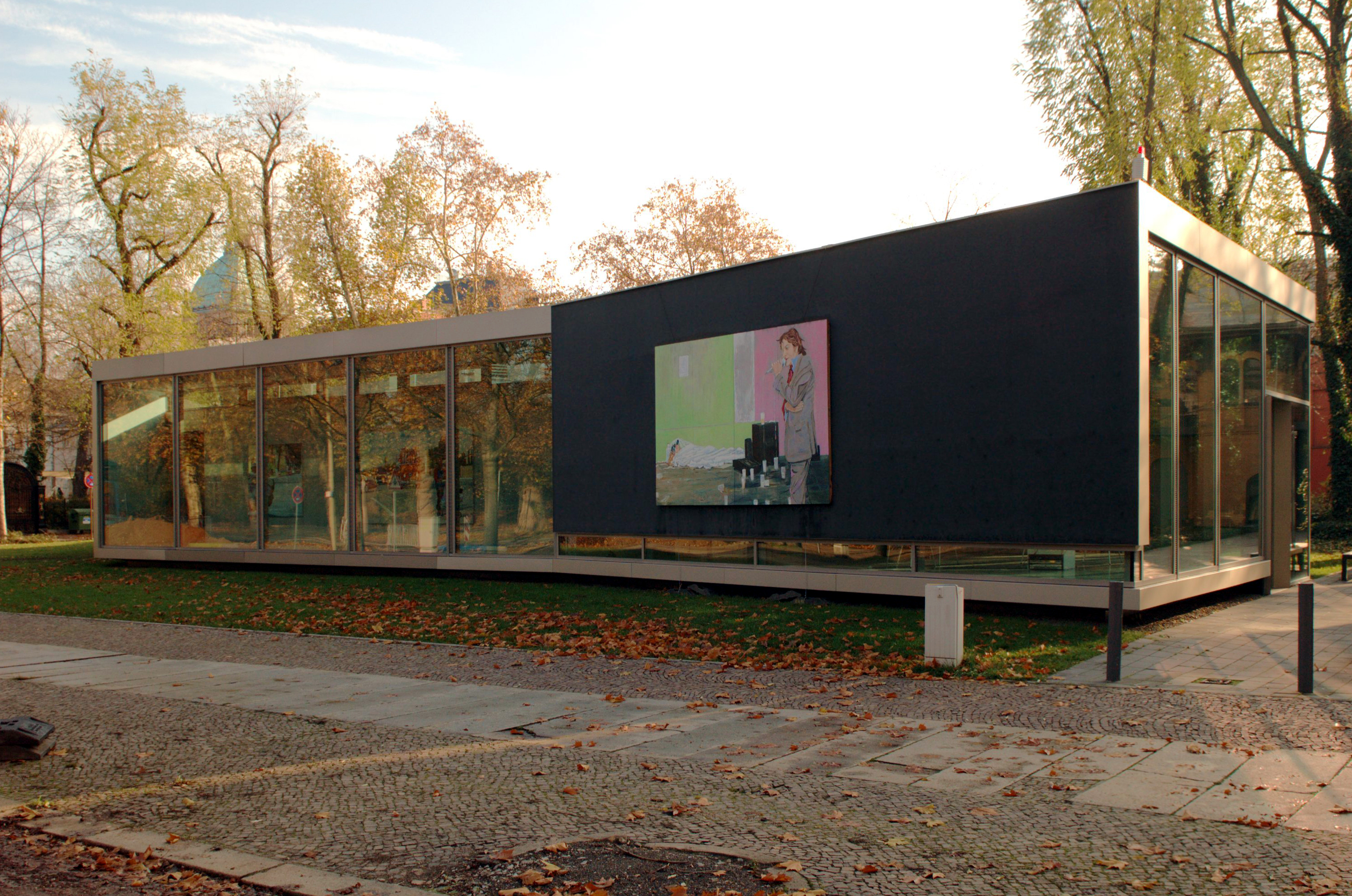
Galerie für Zeitgenössische Kunst – Exhibition Hall GfZK-2 (2006)

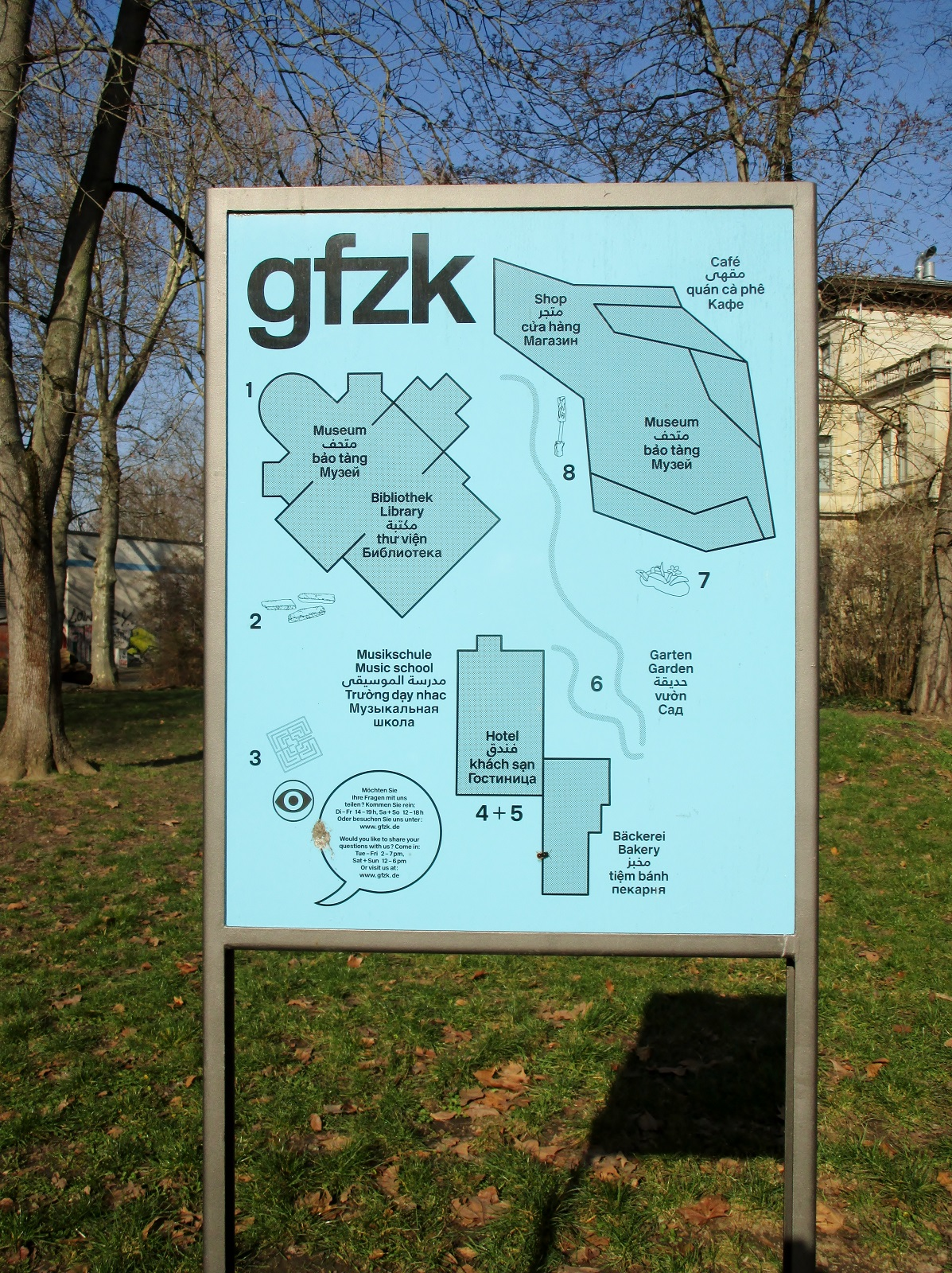
gfzk overview plan

The Galerie für Zeitgenössische Kunst Leipzig (GfZK) (English: Gallery for Contemporary Art) is an exhibition center for contemporary art and a museum for art post 1945 in Leipzig, Germany, in a beautiful location opposite Johannapark.

== History ==
The Friends of the GfZK is a group founded at the end of 1990 on the initiative of the Leipzig art historian Klaus Werner with the support of the German Business Cultural Group in the Federation of German Industries (BDI) and has set itself the goal of promoting national and international contemporary art.

Initially, from 1991 onwards, exhibitions were held in other people's premises. The gallery received its own exhibition space in 1998.

On May 16 of that year, the gallery opened its own building in the neighbourhood Musikviertel of Leipzig-Mitte, not far from the Hochschule für Grafik und Buchkunst Leipzig (HGB) (English: Academy of Fine Arts Leipzig). The exhibition rooms are located in the former Herfurth villa of the newspaper publisher Edgar Herfurth, built in 1894 in the style of the Gründerzeit, which was redesigned by Peter Kulka between 1996 and 1998 and expanded with a cube-shaped extension. The renovation project was awarded the Architekturpreis der Stadt Leipzig in 1999. In addition to the exhibition rooms, the villa houses a publicly accessible library with literature on relevant topics (around 30,000 volumes). The former coach house belonging to the villa was supplemented with the addition of a studio house designed by Peter Kulka and today (2024) houses a music school, a bakery and the GfZK Hotel.

On 28 November 2004, a new exhibition hall (GfZK-2) designed by as-if berlin wien was opened, significantly expanding the exhibition space. The functional low-rise building, which also houses the museum café, is designed flexibly thanks to a novel spatial concept with movable partitions. The cost-effective building also attracted attention in the German architectural scene and also received the Architekturpreis der Stadt Leipzig in 2005.

The museum is now supported by a foundation consisting of the Free State of Saxony, the city of Leipzig and the Friends of the GfZK. One of the museum's most important donors is the entrepreneur (including Schwartauer Werke) and art patron Arend Oetker, who finances a significant part of the house's operation.

== Collection and exhibitions ==
The spectrum of works shown at the GfZK ranges from paintings, graphics, photographs, collages and sculptures to installation art as well as video and media art. The core of the museum's own collection consists of part of the collection of the BDI's cultural group of German business and was supplemented by private donations, purchases by the Friends of the GfZK and permanent loans. Numerous temporary exhibitions and other cross-exhibition projects deal with, among other things, the social role of art and aesthetics, the legacy of the GDR and art from Eastern and Southeastern Europe in an international context.

== Directors ==
- Klaus Werner (1998-2001)
- Barbara Steiner (2001-2012)
- Franciska Zólyom (since 2012)

== Art installation "Labyrinth" ==
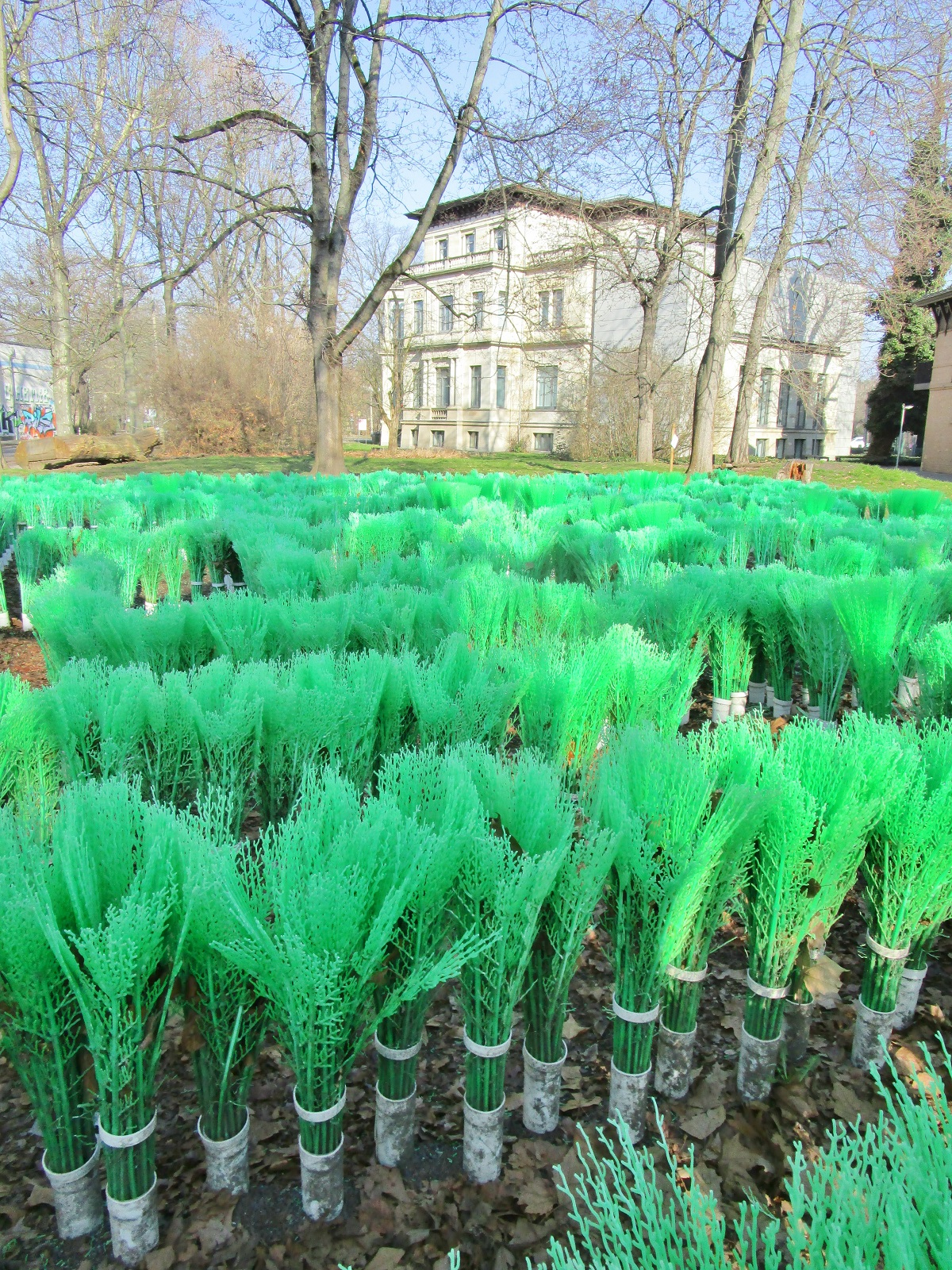
«Labyrinth» by Olaf Nicolai

The art installation “Labyrinth” by the artist Olaf Nicolai is located in the publicly accessible garden of the museum. Made from upturned brooms from the Paris city cleaning service, it is an attraction for children and an iconic public work of art in Leipzig. In the meantime (2024) the components have become brittle due to constant exposure to UV rays and the weather. Research is being carried out "in order to realize a version of the work of art that does justice to the artistic interest in the contradictions of the material and at the same time the current need for sustainability." In autumn 2024, the installation was removed. The reopening was on 29 March 2025, after blending a UV-resistant additive with the polypropylene used to produce the brooms.

== Bibliography ==
- Thomas Höpel (2019), "Kultur, Kunst und Bildung", in Ulrich von Hehl (ed.), Geschichte der Stadt Leipzig, Band 4, Vom Ersten Weltkrieg bis zur Gegenwart (in German), Leipzig: Leipziger Universitätsverlag, pp. 935f, ISBN 978-3-86583-804-9
- Elke Krasny (Hrsg.): Hands on Urbanism 1850-2012. Vom Recht auf Grün, Verlag Turia + Kant, Wien 2012, ISBN 978-3-85132-677-2.
