= Via Lewandowsky =

German artist (born 1963)

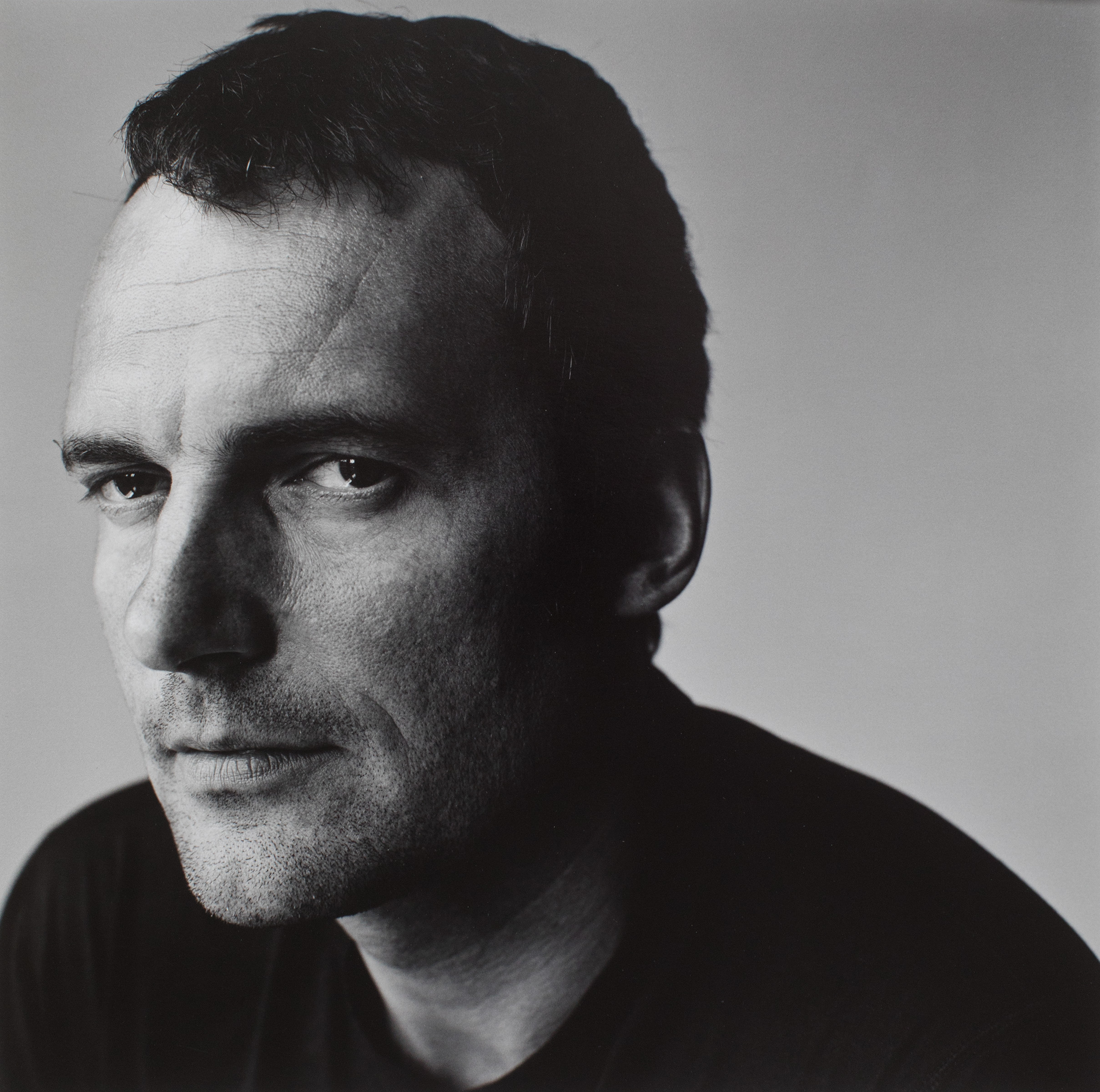
Via Lewandowsky photographed by Oliver Mark, Berlin 2003

Volker Via Lewandowsky (born 7 March 1963, in Dresden) is a German artist who works with installation, sculpture, object art, photography, performance, painting and drawing.

Poem for an Artist

Born in Dresden in 1963
lost an eye at the age of three
because of arts. Since then, a devotee.
Ergo: unshorn no one will ever be.

Durs Grünbein, 1997

== Life ==
Via Lewandowsky studied at the Dresden Academy of Fine Arts from 1982 until 1987. Starting in 1985, he organised subversive performances together with the avant-garde group Autoperforationsartisten that undermined the Communist art authorities of Eastern Germany (GDR). In 1989, shortly before the fall of the Berlin Wall, he left the GDR and subsequently moved to West Berlin. Since then, he has travelled extensively and has lived for extended periods in New York, Rome, Peking and Canada. He now resides in Berlin.

== Work ==
Via Lewandowsky works in diverse artistic media. He is most familiar for his sculptural-installation works and exhibition scenographies with architectonic influences such as Gehirn und Denken: Kosmos im Kopf [Brain and Thinking: Cosmos in Mind: 2000] displayed at the German Hygiene Museum in Dresden. By the 1990s his work had already begun to incorporate elements of Sound Art; this has since become an important and integral part of much of his performance work.

Content, not form, is the unifying theme in Via Lewandowsky's body of work. Dominant recurring themes include: misunderstanding as failure of communication and the deformation and deconstruction of meaning. Another hallmark of Via's work is that ideas are represented as process rather than completion. The artist is neither looking for something conclusive, a definitive ending, nor complete destruction but rather for the constructive moment within a process of destruction. This identification of the in-between moment is highlighted by the work's inherently satirical content that does not try to elicit pathos from its audience. Via's work does not confer objects with disrespect but rather admiration and amazement.

His working method and the effectiveness of its artistic results are often characterized by opposites. Elements that are controlled, staged and constantly emerging also have spontaneous, unexpected, and thus lively qualities. Humoristic, seemingly lighthearted works viewed a second time contain gruesome, brutal moments that can turn the comedic into the disturbing.

His preference for tragicomedy, absurdity and paradox as well as the Sisyphean drama of continuous repetition and futility of action link Via Lewandowsky's art with Dadaism, Surrealism and Fluxus. The ironic breaks with everyday life, the intrusion of the strange into the familiar, often domestic realm take place in his work by using the detritus of the German bourgeoisie: cuckoo clocks, DIY garden sheds, parakeets or bureaucracy. His interest in a nation's construction of identity exposes a political dimension in his work.

== Works in Public Space ==
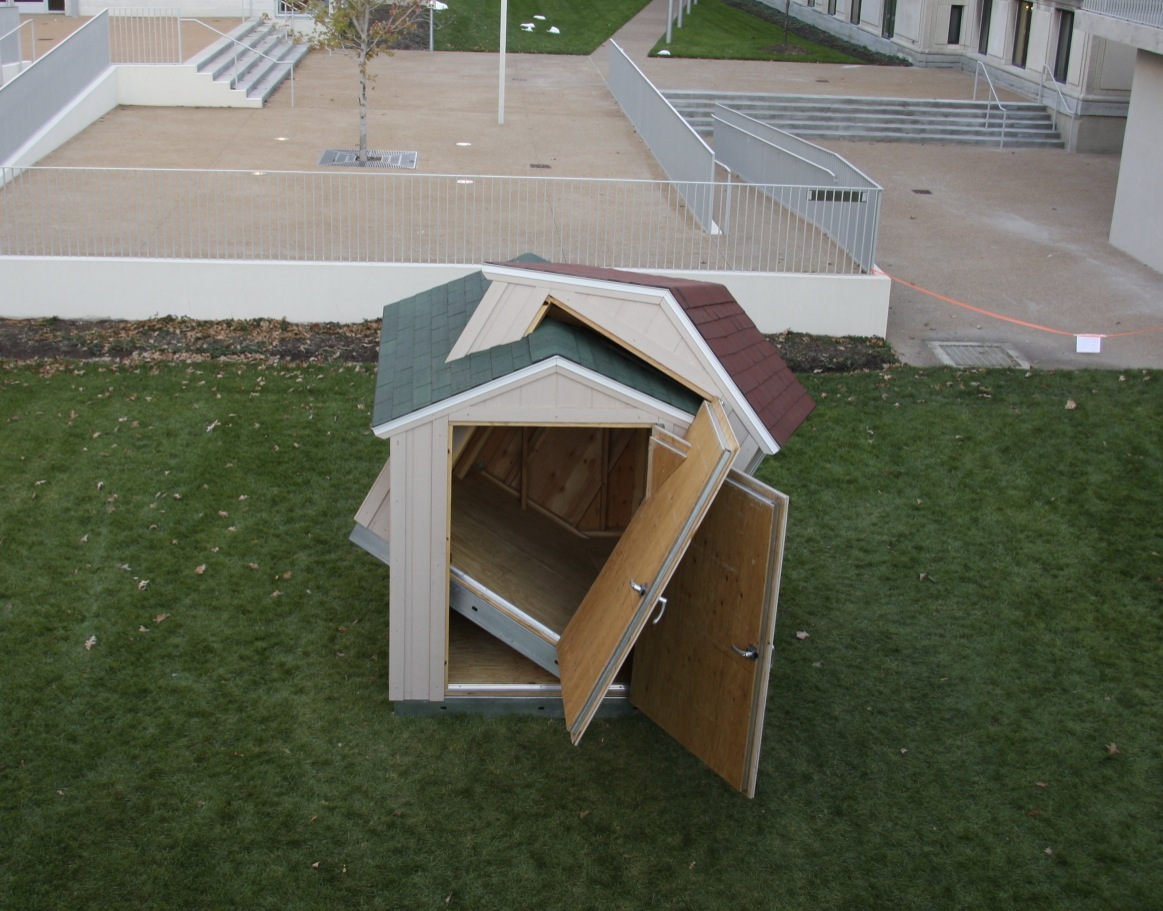
Via Lewandowsky's sculpture From Behind (Doggy Style), 2006, in the permanent collection of the Mildred Lane Kemper Art Museum, St. Louis, Missouri

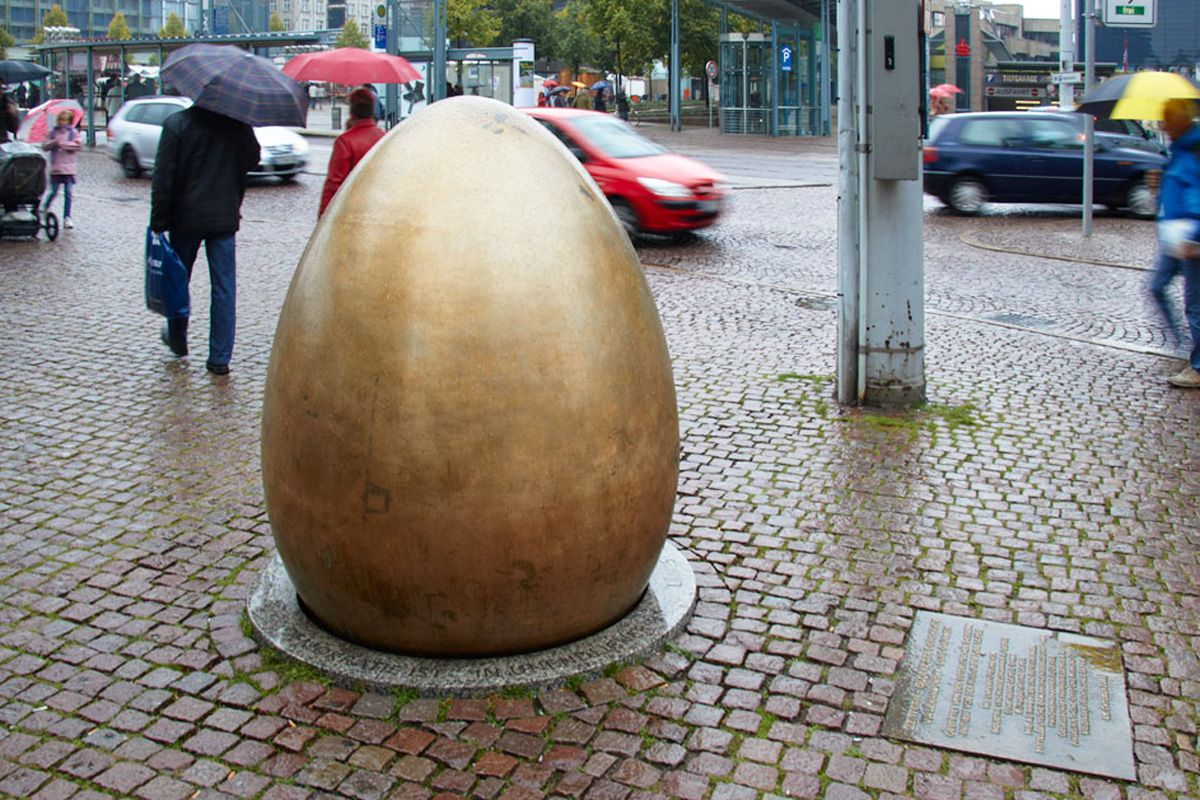
The democracy bell (2010)

Via's installations in public spaces confirm this, as do his performances, which create an awareness of the structures of historiography. In 2009 his contribution to the 20th anniversary of the Monday demonstrations in East Germany (specifically Leipzig) took the form of a confetti parade. Cannon were fired at the participants with the fusillades consisting of confetti made from miniature business cards bearing the code names and professions of thousands of the Stasi's domestic spies. Information for the business cards was acquired from documentation at the Federal Commissioner for the Stasi Records (or Birthler office) in Leipzig.

On 9 October 2009, in Leipzig was unveiled the public art object "Democracy bell" at the Augustusplatz.

Via Lewandowsky's public works of art cannot be reduced to any obvious political element. Von hinten (Doggy Style) [From Behind (Doggy Style): 2006], in the collection of the Mildred Lane Kemper Art Museum in St. Louis, Missouri, plays with absurdity and puzzle of form and content. As with many of his works, the title points at the work's inherent double entendre and hints at bigotry, thereby increasing its effect on the viewer.

A work installed at a public site central to Germany history in Berlin is Roter Teppich [Red Carpet: 2003]. Laid out in the entrance hall of the Bendlerblock, this oversized carpet, when viewed from above, shows a war-torn Berlin and ironically refers to the military term carpet bombing. The irony is heightened by the choice of location, as the Bendler Block is currently the home of the German Federal Ministry of Defence. Roter Teppich's overlapping of various layers of comprehension and the conscious aim of misguiding his audience by constructing unclear narrative threads are characteristic qualities of Via Lewandowsky's work.

== Fellowships and Awards (selection) ==
1991: New York Fellowship of the Berlin Senate Administration at P.S. 1 Contemporary Art Center (today: MoMA PS 1)

1994: Fellowship at Banff Centre for the Arts, Canada

1995: Art Award, Leipziger Volkszeitung

1997: Grant, Stiftung Kunstfonds Bonn

1998: Botho Graef Award of the City of Jena

2005: Working Grant, Beijing Case, Peking

2008: Fellowship Villa Aurora, Los Angeles

2011: Fellowship Villa Massimo, Rome

== Sources and Links ==
- Artist website
- Kunstaspekte.de: Via Lewandowsky
- Permanent installation by Via L. at the Jewish Museum in Berlin with artist photo
