= Willendorf in der Wachau =

Village in Lower Austria

Coordinates: 48°19′21″N 15°24′17″E

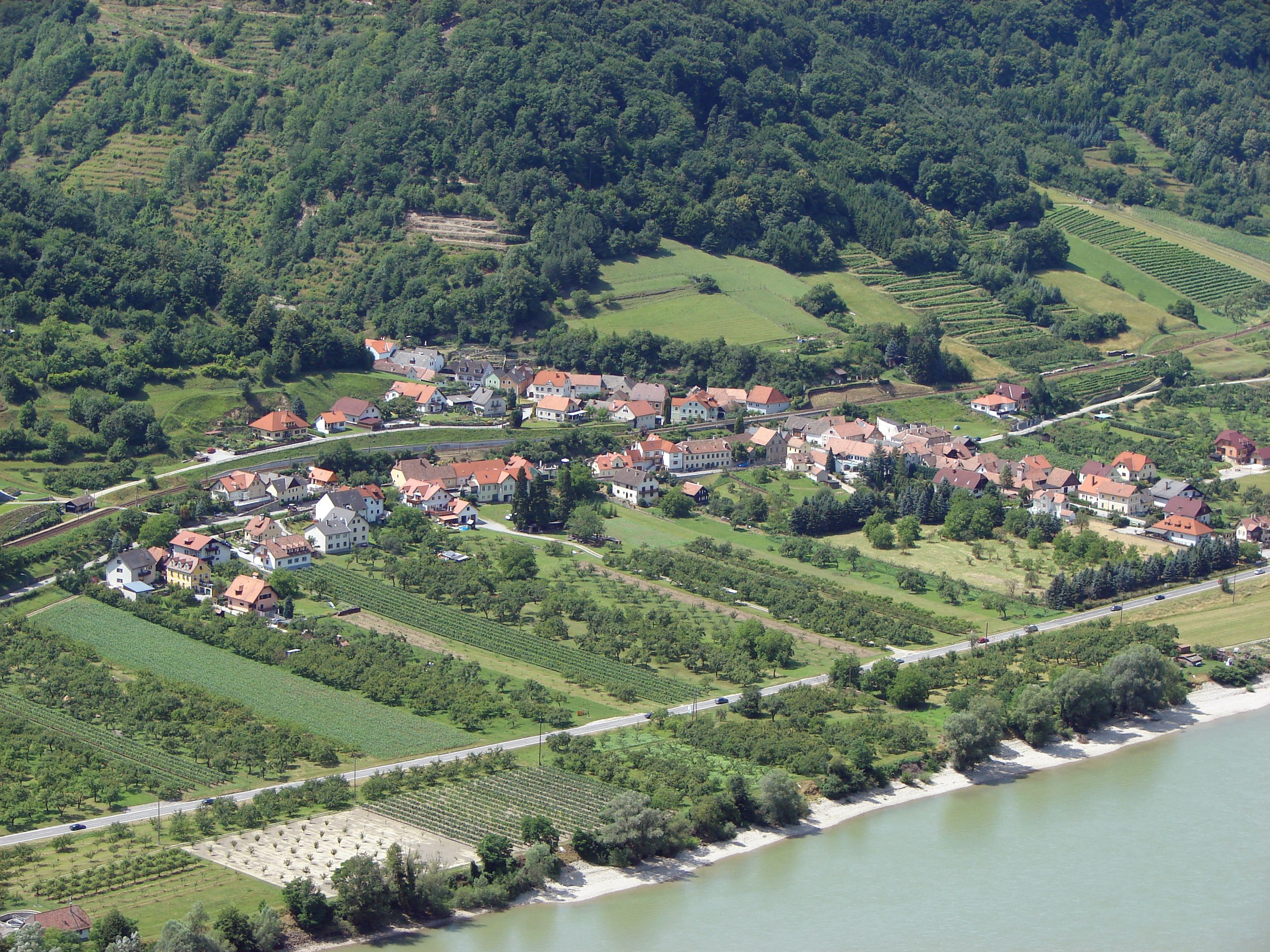
Willendorf seen from Aggstein Castle.

Willendorf, or when ambiguous Willendorf in der Wachau, is a village in the Wachau valley in Lower Austria.

Willendorf became globally known when in 1908 the 30,000-year-old Venus of Willendorf was found there.

== Geography ==
Willendorf is 209 m above sea level on the left bank of the Danube River, between Aggsbach market and Spitz. The village has 154 inhabitants.

== Archaeology ==
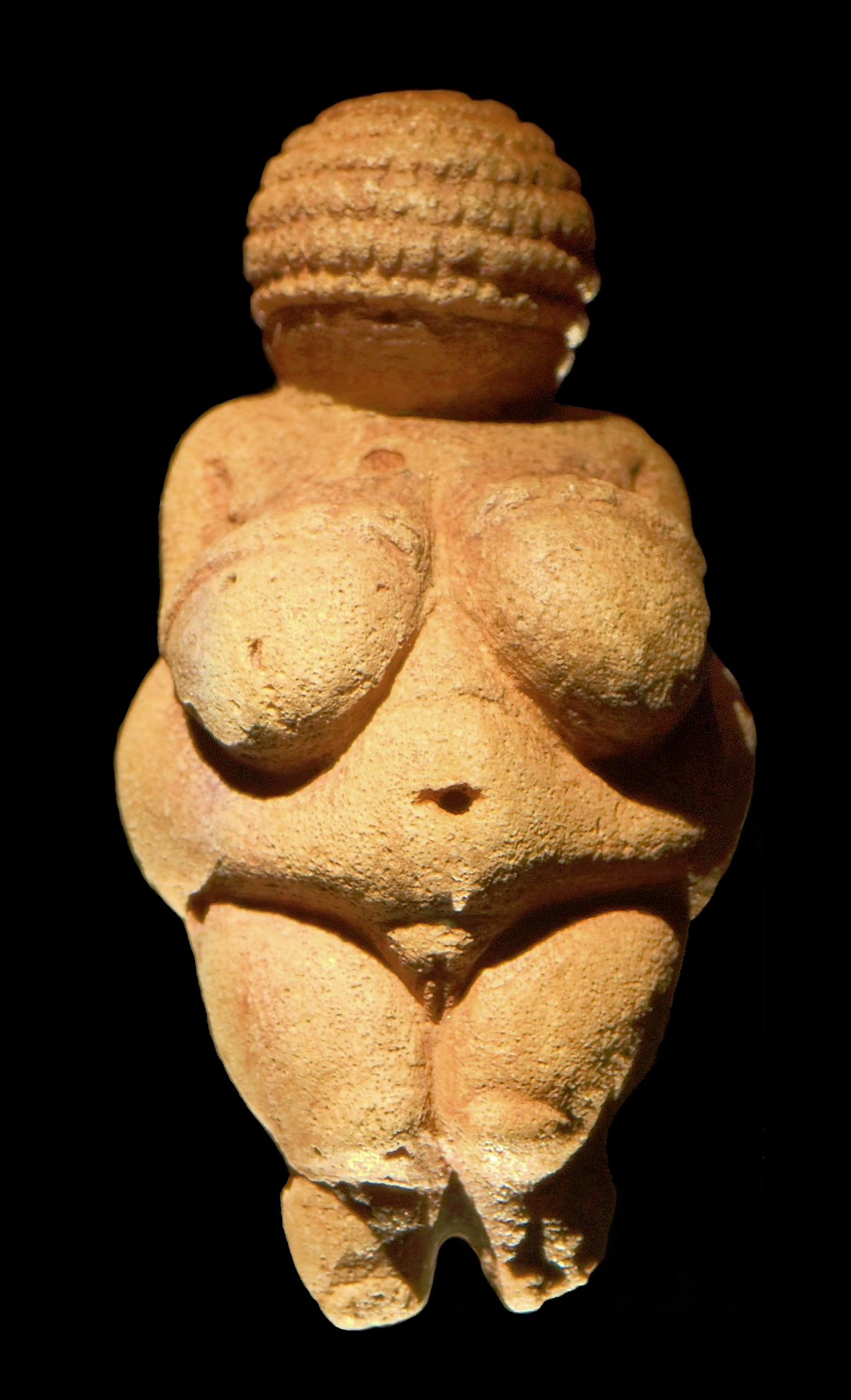
Venus of Willendorf

The Venus of Willendorf was discovered in Willendorf in 1908 and remains the most important Upper Palaeolithic find in Austria. It is around 30,000 years old. Other finds at Willendorf have shown that the site has been occupied for around 50,000 years.

The Venus of Willendorf is part of the permanent exhibition of the Natural History Museum of Vienna.

== Economy ==
Today, tourism, wine, and the growing of fruit are important parts of the Willendorf economy.
