= Venus of Willendorf =

Prehistoric figurine from Austria

Coordinates: 48°19′N 15°23′E

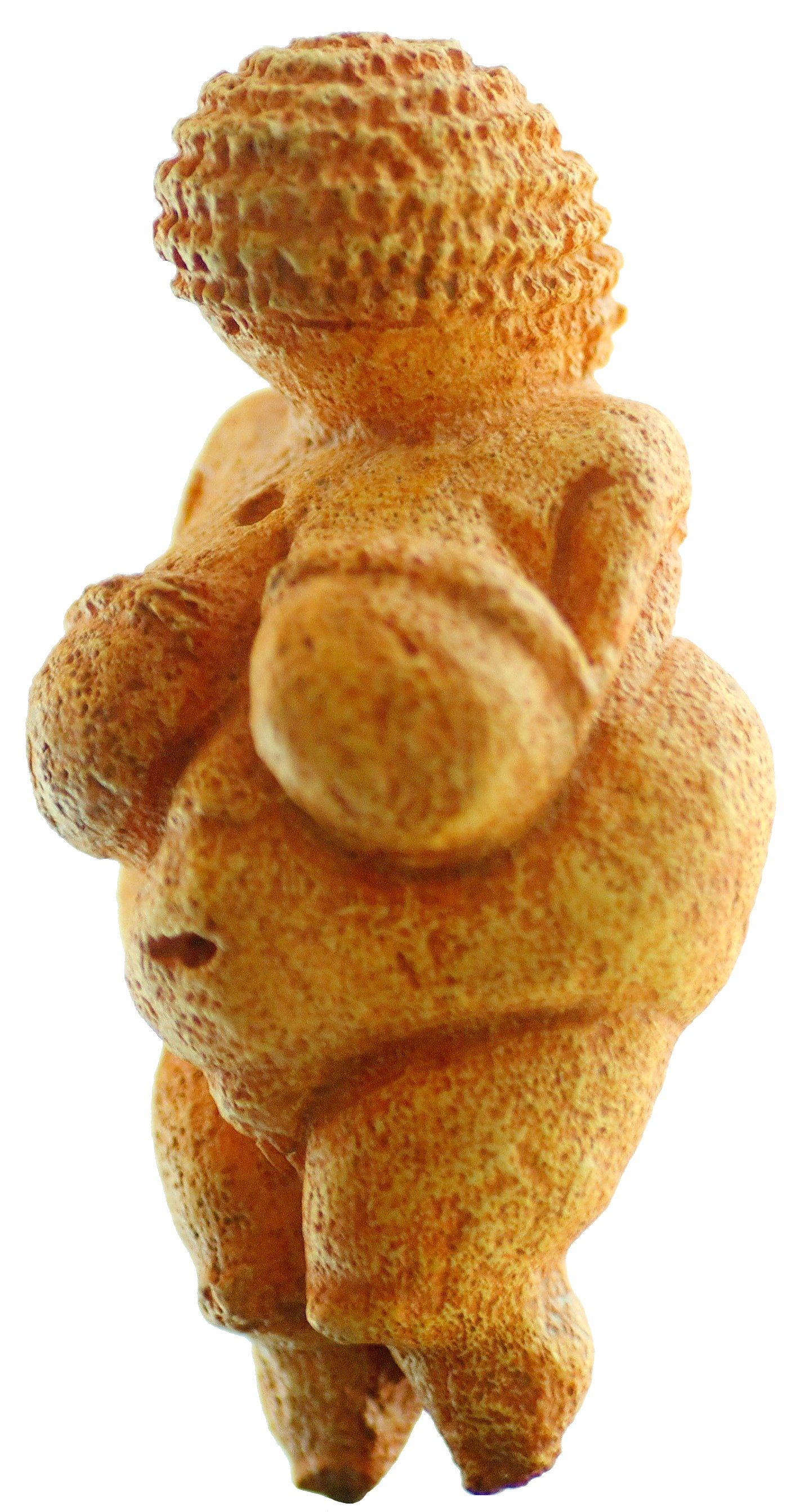
- Material: Oolitic limestone
- Created: c. 30,000 BP
- Discovered: 7 August 1908, near Willendorf, by Josef Szombathy
- Present location: Naturhistorisches Museum, Vienna, Austria

The Venus of Willendorf is an 11.1-centimetre-tall (4.4 in) Venus figurine estimated to have been made c. 30,000 years ago. It was recovered on 7 August 1908 on an archaeological dig conducted by Josef Szombathy, Hugo Obermaier, and Josef Bayer at a Paleolithic site near Willendorf, a village in Lower Austria. The figurine was found by a workman named either Johann Veran or Josef Veram and is carved from an oolitic limestone that is not local to the area, and tinted with red ochre. It is in the Natural History Museum in Vienna, Austria as of 2003.

As with similar figurines, evidence of the sculptor's intent is scant. The appellation of Venus reflects speculation by modern archeologists that the figure depicts a fertility goddess. Others suggest it may be a self-portrait.

== Dating ==
The figure is associated with the Upper Paleolithic Gravettian industry, which dates to between 33,000 and 20,000 years ago. The figure itself is estimated to have been left in the ground around 30,000 years ago, based on radiocarbon dates from the layers surrounding it.

== Interpretation and purpose ==
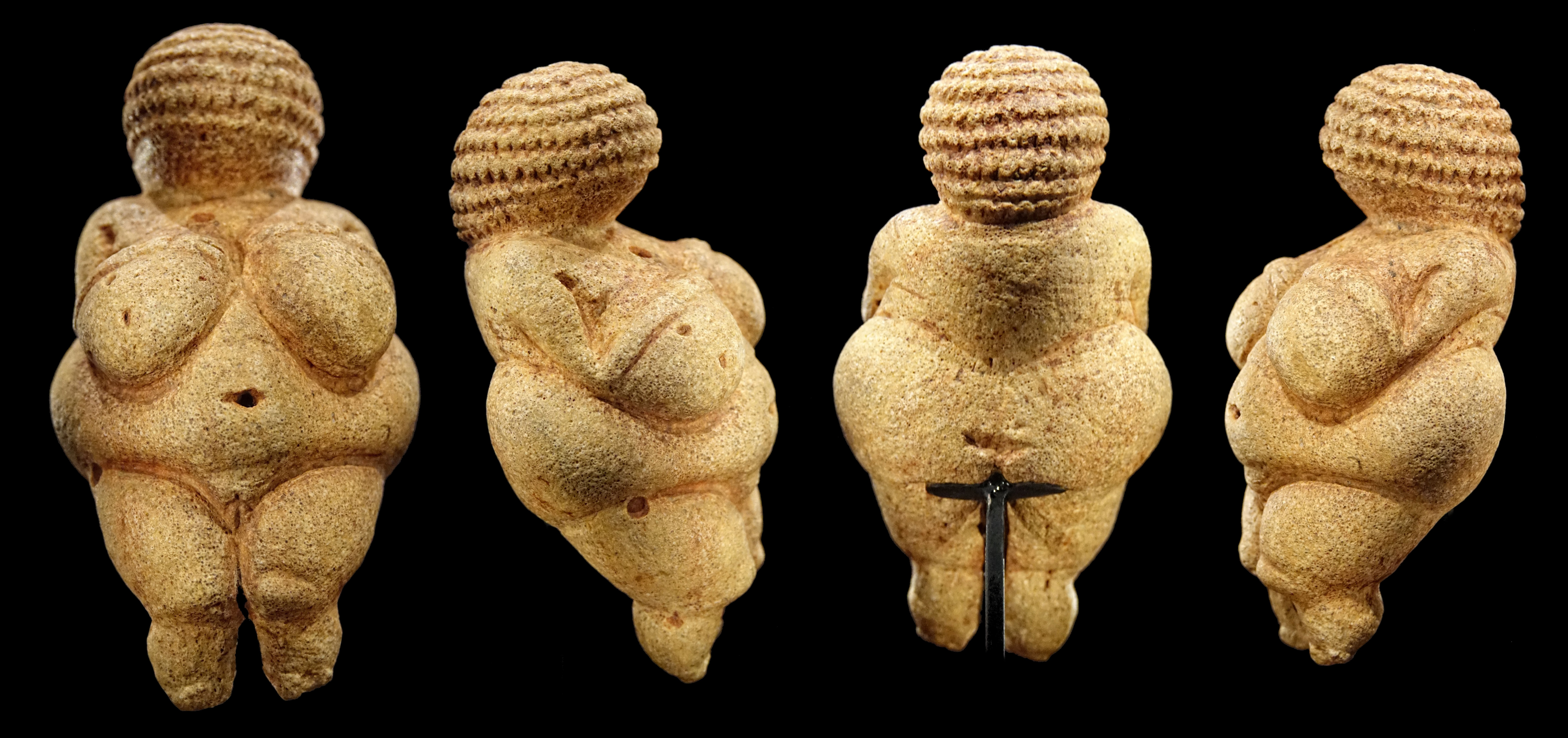
Figurine seen from four sides

Similar sculptures, first discovered in the nineteenth and early twentieth centuries, are traditionally referred to in archaeology as "Venus figurines", due to the widely held belief that depictions of nude women with exaggerated sexual features represented an early fertility deity, perhaps a mother goddess. The reference to Venus is metaphorical, since the figurines predate the mythological figure of Venus by many thousands of years. Some scholars reject this terminology, instead referring to the statuette as the Woman of or from Willendorf.

3D model of replica (click to interact)

Very little is known about the Venus' origin, method of creation, or cultural significance; however, it is one of numerous "Venus figurines" surviving from Paleolithic Europe. The purpose of the carving is the subject of much speculation. Like other similar sculptures, it probably never had feet, and would not have stood on its own, although it might have been pegged into soft ground. Parts of the body associated with fertility and childbearing have been emphasized, leading some researchers to believe that the Venus of Willendorf and similar figurines may have been used as fertility goddesses. The figure has no visible face, her head being covered with circular horizontal bands of what might be rows of plaited hair, or perhaps a type of headdress.

Catherine McCoid and LeRoy McDermott hypothesize that the figurines may have been created as self-portraits by women. This theory stems from the correlation of the proportions of the statues to how the proportions of women's bodies would seem if they were looking down at themselves, which would have been the only way to view their bodies during this period. They speculate that the complete lack of facial features could be accounted for by the fact that sculptors did not own mirrors. This reasoning has been criticized by McGill University anthropologist Michael S. Bisson, who notes that water pools and puddles would have been readily available natural mirrors for Paleolithic humans.

== Stone's source ==
Research published in 2022 indicates that the closest and most likely source of the oolite used is on the other side of the Alps in northern Italy, near Lake Garda. A lesser possibility is that it came from a site in eastern Ukraine some 1,600 km (1,000 mi) away. While the former has the highest statistical probability, the latter is closer to sites in southern Russia where similarly styled figurines have been found. In either case, this raises questions regarding the mobility of ancient populations.

== See also ==
- Art of the Upper Paleolithic
- List of Stone Age art
- History of nude art
